= Hanfu =

Historical dress of the Han Chinese people

- Traditional Chinese: 漢服
- Simplified Chinese: 汉服
- Literal meaning: "Han (Chinese) attire"
Transcriptions
Standard Mandarin
- Hanyu Pinyin: Hànfú
- IPA: [xân.fǔ]
Yue: Cantonese
- Jyutping: Hon^{3}-fuk^{6}
- IPA: [hɔn˩.fʊk̚˨]
Southern Min
- Hokkien POJ: Hàn-ho̍k

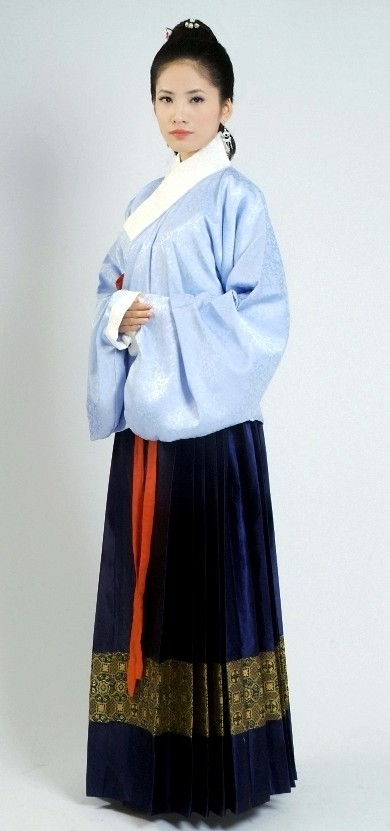
A Chinese woman wearing a reconstructed Aoqun, a popular style of female dress from the Ming dynasty

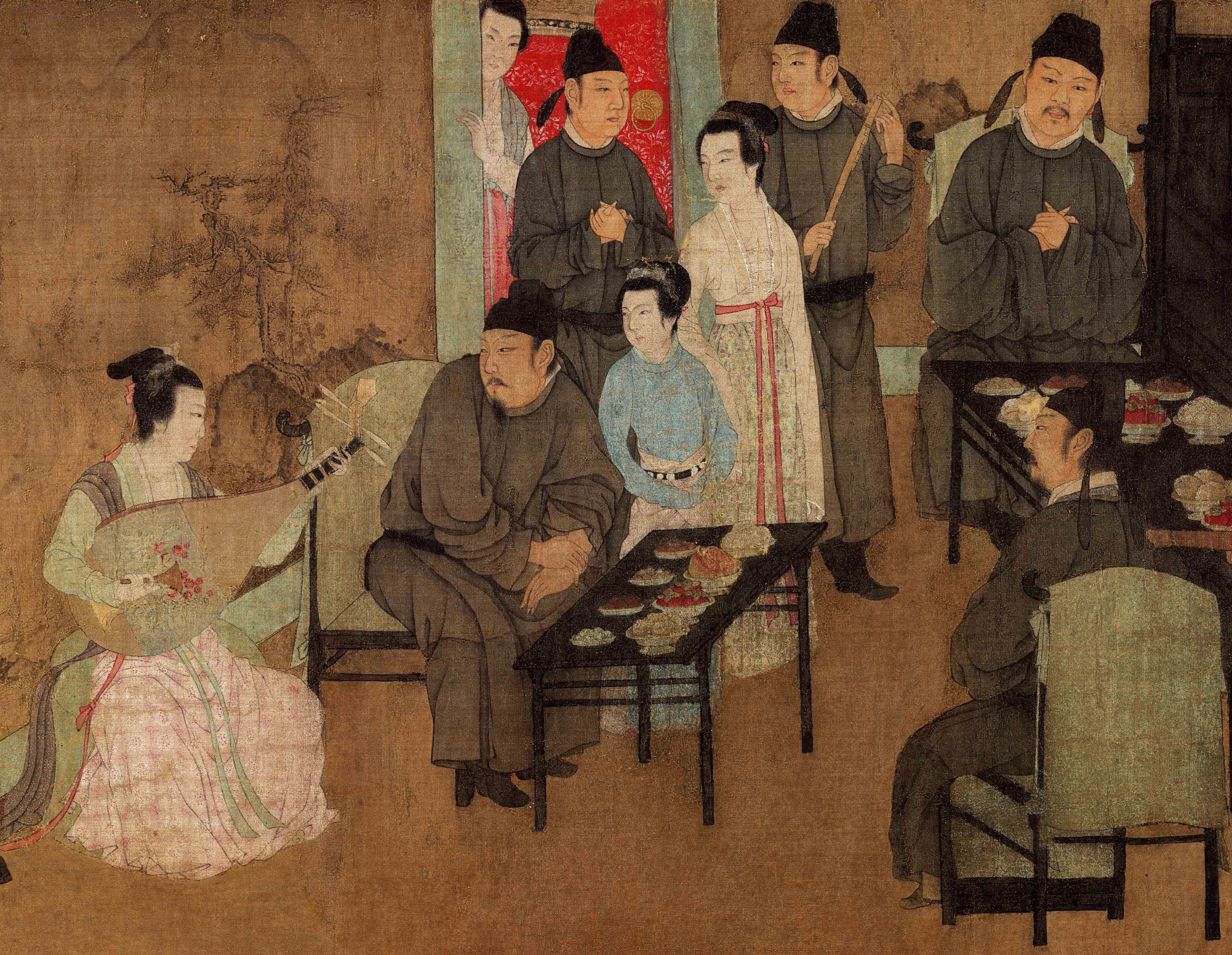
The Night Revels of Han Xizai, a Song-era painting after an original by Gu Hongzhong

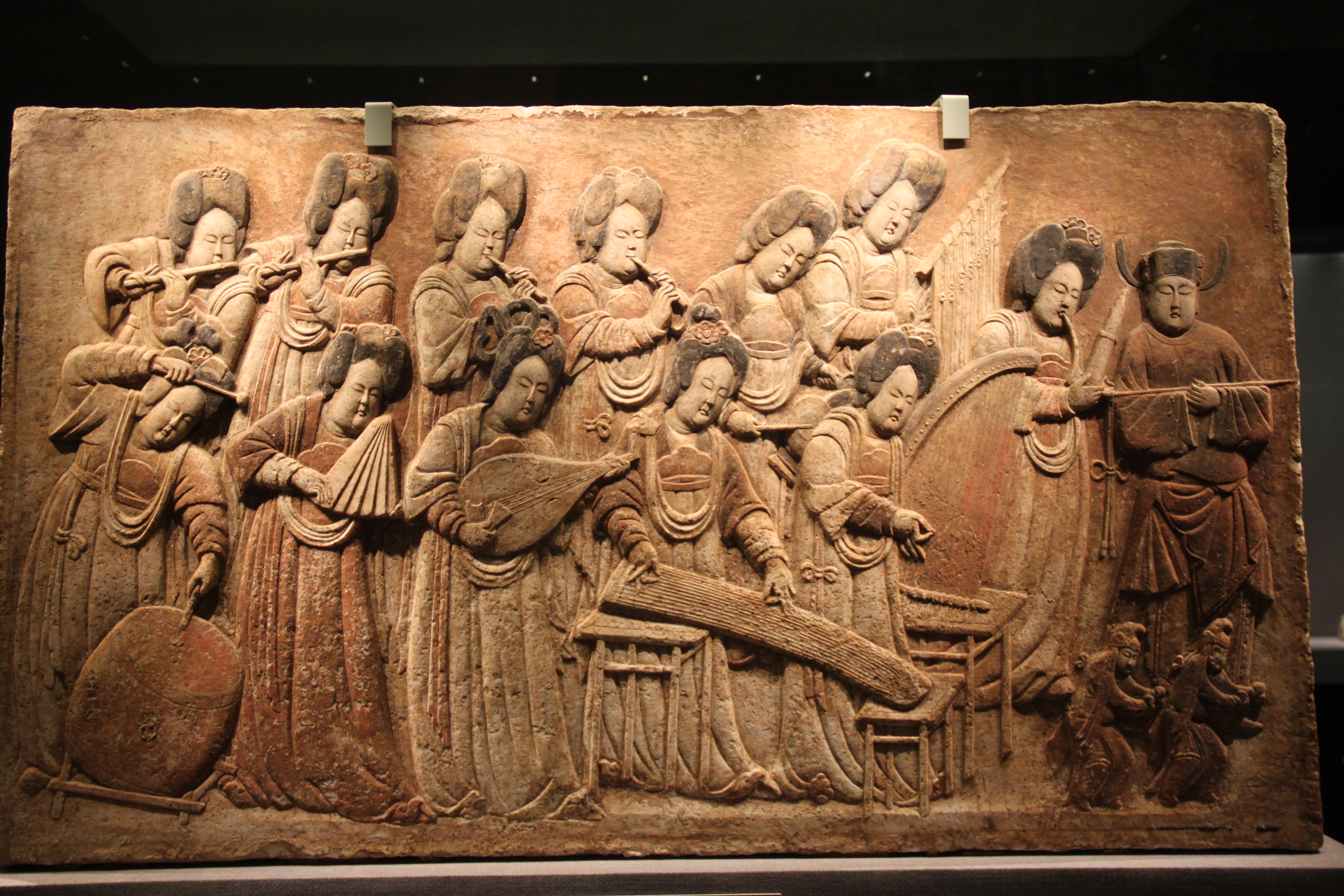
Court musicians in Qixiong Ruqun; decorative stone relief, Five dynasties.

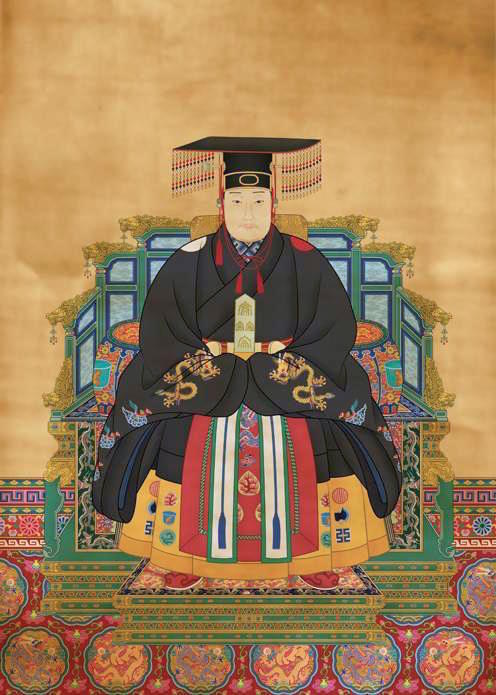
Wanli Emperor in Mianfu, late 16th century

Hanfu (simplified Chinese: 汉服; traditional Chinese: 漢服; pinyin: Hànfú, lit. "Han clothing"), also known as Hanzhuang (simplified Chinese: 汉装; traditional Chinese: 漢裝; pinyin: Hànzhuāng, "Han attire") or traditional Chinese clothing, are historical Chinese clothings worn by the majority Han Chinese people from at least the 2nd millennium BC to the mid-17th century AD — encompassing nearly all of the recorded history of China up to the end of the Ming dynasty — until violent conquest and forced assimilation by the Qing dynasty led to their replacement by the Manchu qizhuang and magua in a historical event known as Tifayifu. Due to the rise of China since the start of the 21st century, there is currently a growing cultural movement among the younger generations in Mainland China and the Chinese diaspora to revive and reinstate hanfu as the genuine, orthodox representative of Chinese culture and aesthetics, as opposed to the Manchu-inspired qipao and tangzhuang and the Japanese school uniform (gakuran)-inspired Mao suit.

There are several representative styles of hanfu, such as the ruqun (a long skirt worn high over the upper garment), aoqun (an upper garment with a long underskirt), beizi (a loose-fitting, open-front coat) and shenyi (one-piece robe), and the shanku (an upper-body garment with trousers). Historically, the most common formal style of hanfu consists of a broad-sleeved robe named paofu for men, or the pairing of an upper garment named ru (jacket) with a lower garment named qun (skirt) for women. In almost all these styles, at least one of the upper garments (either the overgarment or the undergarment), will have crossing collars (known as jiaoling) with the left front panel overlapping the right panel and fastened at the right waist (known as youren), typically by a knotted ribbon. In addition to clothing, hanfu also includes several forms of headwear, footwear and accessories, such as belts and buckles, hand fans, jewellery, jade belt pendants (yupei), bracelets, and sachets.

As with many traditional Chinese things, hanfu derives its name from the Han dynasty, the first golden age of China with international sphere of influence. The centuries-long prosperity and stability of the Han dynasty allowed hanfu to develop into a variety of styles due to a number of technological advancements in textile production and dyeing, particularly with rapid advancements in sericulture. Due to the historical dominance of China in the Far East, hanfu has also influenced the traditional fashions of many neighbouring countries within the Chinese cultural sphere, including the Korean hanbok, the Japanese kimono, the Ryukyuan ryusou and the Vietnamese áo giao lĩnh. Elements of hanfu design have also influenced Western fashion, especially through Chinoiserie fashion, due to the popularity of Chinoiserie in Europe and North America since the 17th century.

== History ==
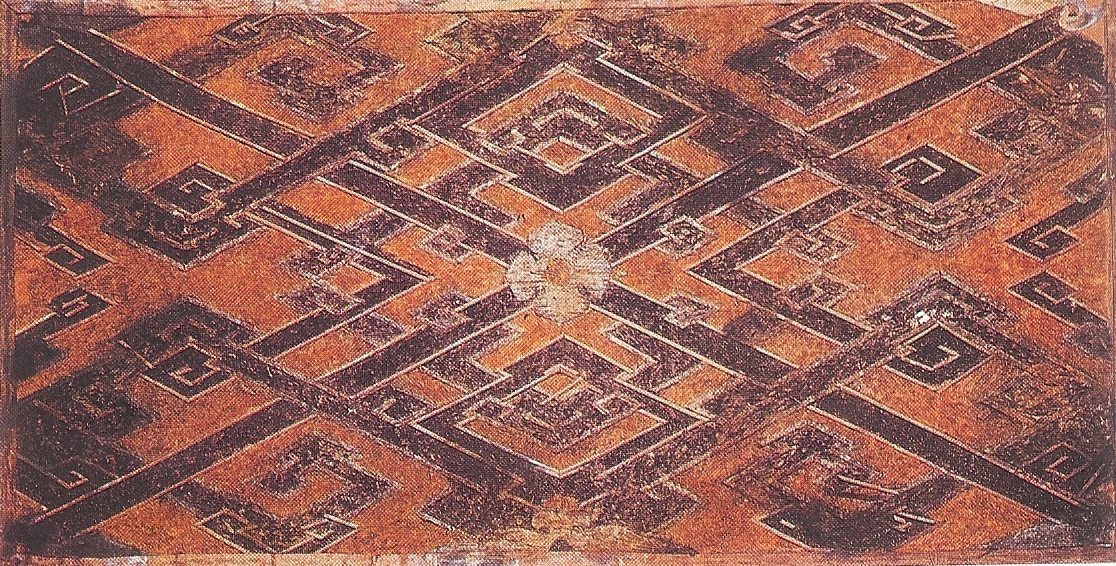
Han-era silk piece from the Mawangdui tomb, 2nd century BCE

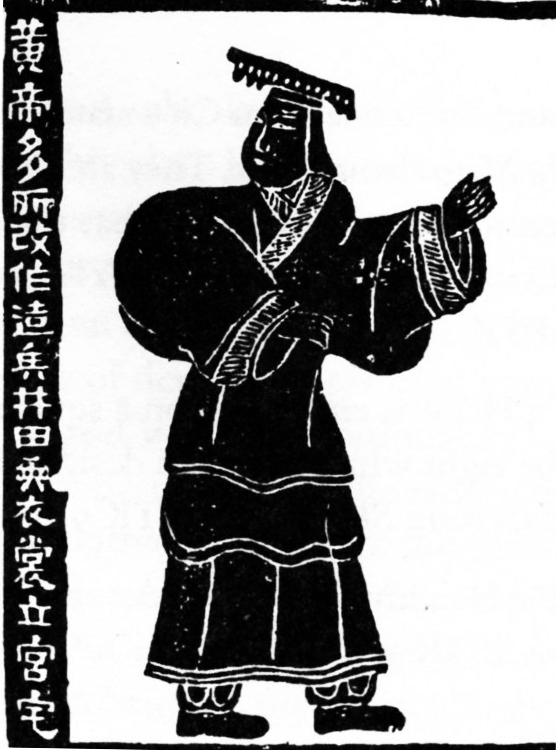
Han dynasty tomb wall carving in Jiaxiang, Shandong, depicting the legendary Yellow Emperor, who was said to have lived in the 3rd millennium BCE.

Hanfu generally comprises all historical clothing classifications of the Han Chinese with a recorded history of more than three millennia. Each succeeding dynasty produced their own distinctive dress codes, reflecting the socio-cultural environment of the times. Clothing made of silk was initially used for decorative and ceremonial purposes. The cultivation of silk, however, ushered the development of weaving, and by the time of the Han dynasty, brocade, damask, satin, and gauze had been developed.

From the beginning of its history, hanfu (especially in elite circles) was inseparable from silk and the art of sericulture, supposedly discovered by the Yellow Emperor's consort Leizu, who was also revered as the Goddess of sericulture. There is even a saying in the Book of Change, which says that:

Huang Di, Yao, and Shun (simply) wore their upper and lower garments [衣裳; yī cháng] (as patterns to the people), and good order was secured all under heaven

Hanfu had changed and evolved with the fashion of the days since its commonly assumed beginnings in the Shang dynasty. Many of the earlier designs are more gender-neutral and simpler in cut than later examples. Later garments incorporate multiple pieces with men commonly wearing pants and women commonly wearing skirts. Clothing for women usually accentuates the body's natural curves through wrapping of upper garment lapels or binding with sashes at the waist.

From ancient times, the ru upper garments of hanfu were typically worn wrapped over the front, in a style known as jiaoling youren; the left side covering the right side and extend to the wearer's right waist. Initially, the style was used because of the habit of the right-handed wearer to wrap the right side first. Later, the people of the Central Chinese Plain discouraged left-handedness, considering it unnatural, barbarian, uncivilized, and unfortunate. The youren collar follows the yin and yang theory, wherein the left lapel represents the yang (which symbolizes life) suppresses the yin (which symbolizes death); therefore, youren is the clothing of the living while if it is worn in the opposite way in a style called zuoren, the clothing then becomes burial clothing and is therefore considered a taboo. Zuoren is also used by some minority ethnic groups in China.

Many factors have contributed to the fashion of ancient China: beliefs, religions, wars, and the emperor's personal liking. Following the Qin dynasty, colours used in the sumptuary laws of the Han Chinese held symbolic meaning, based on the Taoist Five Elements Theory and the yin and yang theory; each dynasty favoured certain colours. Some elements of Hanfu have also been influenced by neighbouring cultural clothing, especially by the nomadic peoples to the north, and Central Asian cultures to the west by way of the Silk Road. (Note: See Hufu.)

=== Shang dynasty, 2nd millennium BCE ===
In China, a systemic structure of clothing was first developed during the Shang dynasty, where colours, designs, and rules governing use was implemented across the social strata. Only primary colours (i.e. red, blue, and yellow) and green were used due to the degree of technology at the time.

The rudiments of hanfu was developed in this period; the combination of upper and lower garments, called yichang, was usually worn with a bixi. The jiaoling youren yi a style of upper garment, started to be worn during this period. In winter, padded jackets were worn. The ku or jingyi, which were knee-high trousers tied onto the calves but left the thighs exposed, were worn under the chang. During this period, this clothing style was unisex. Only rich people wore silk; poor people continued to wear loose shirts and ku made of hemp or ramie. An example of a Shang dynasty attire can be seen on an anthropomorphic jade figurine excavated from the Tomb of Fu Hao in Anyang, which shows a person wearing a long narrow-sleeved yi with a wide band covering around waist, and a skirt underneath. This yichang attire appears to have been designed for the aristocratic class.

Hanfu in Shang dynasty
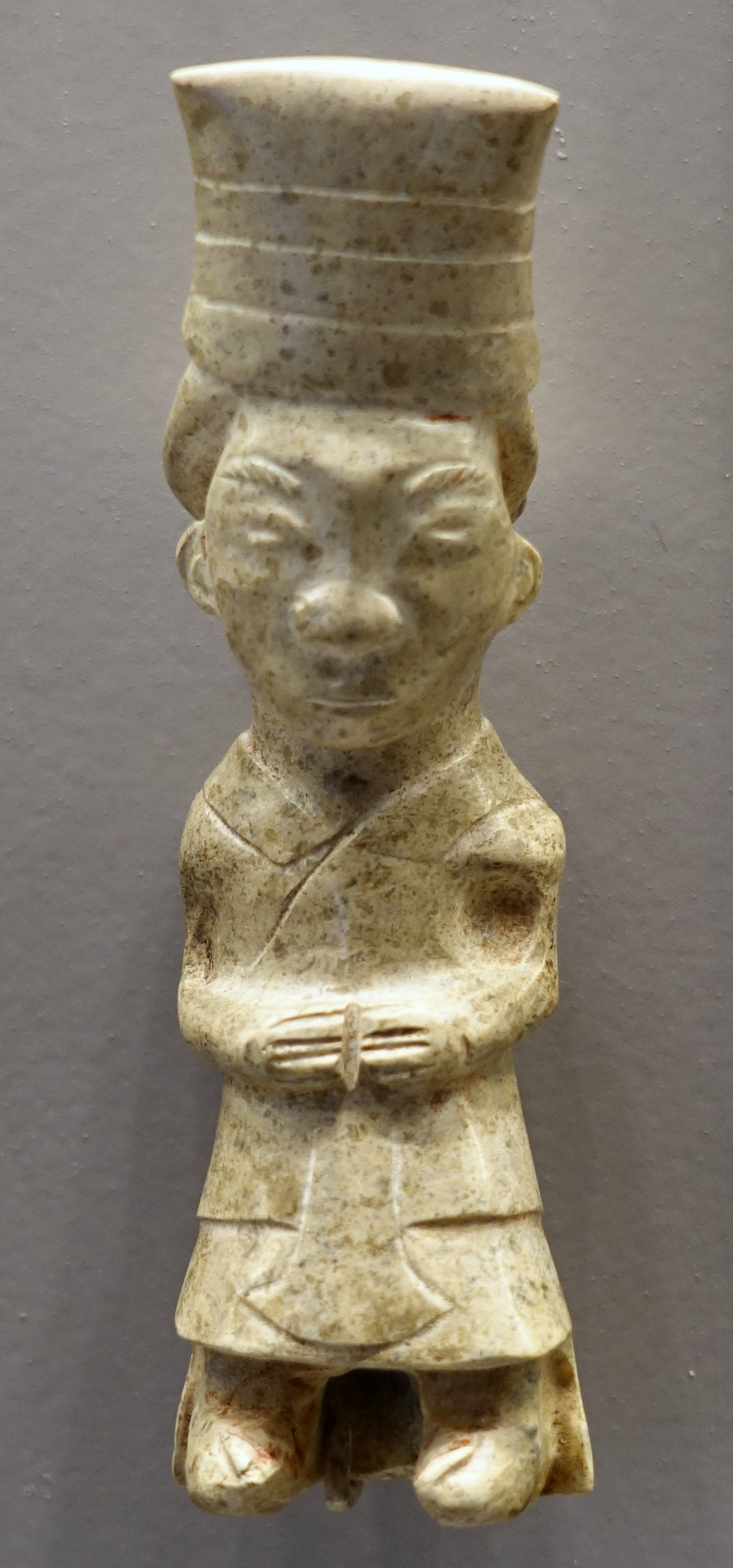
A standing dignitary wearing yichang and bixi, 12th century BCE

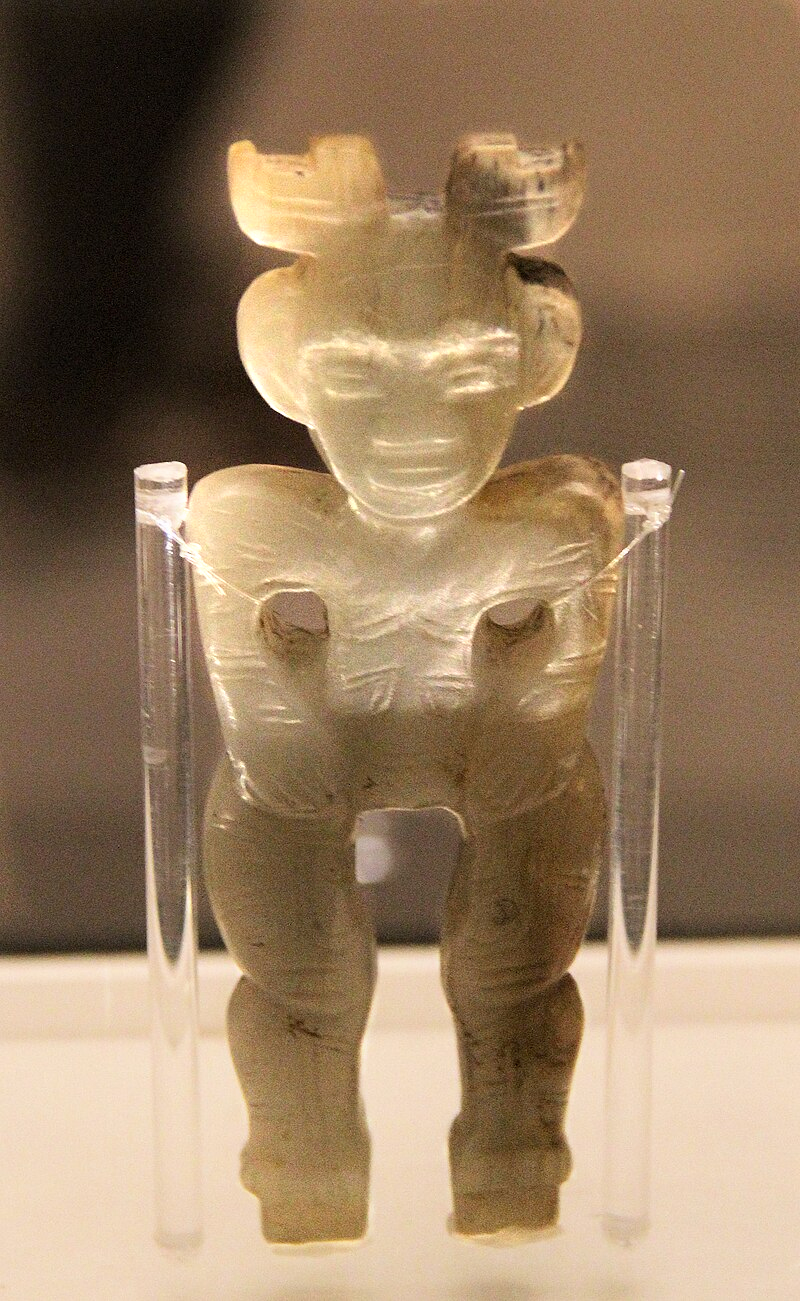
Jade figurine with sartorial details; Fu Hao mausoleum, 2nd millennium BC

=== Zhou dynasty, 1046–256 BCE ===
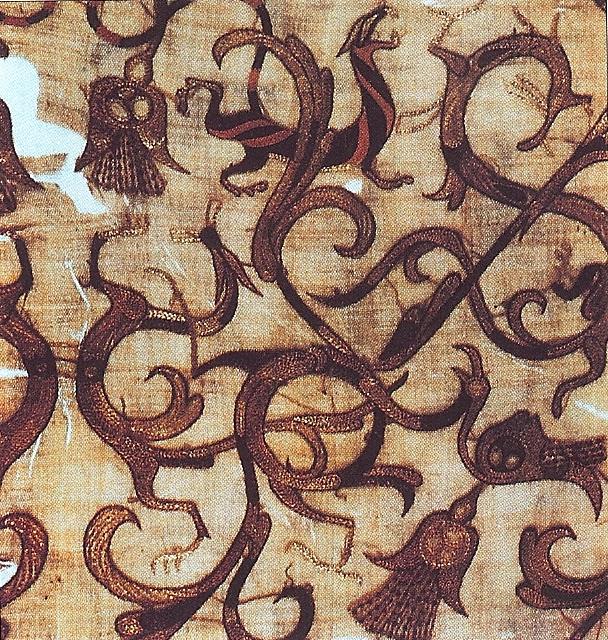
4th century BCE silk gauze; the sericultural industry of the Zhou Dynasty was highly advanced.

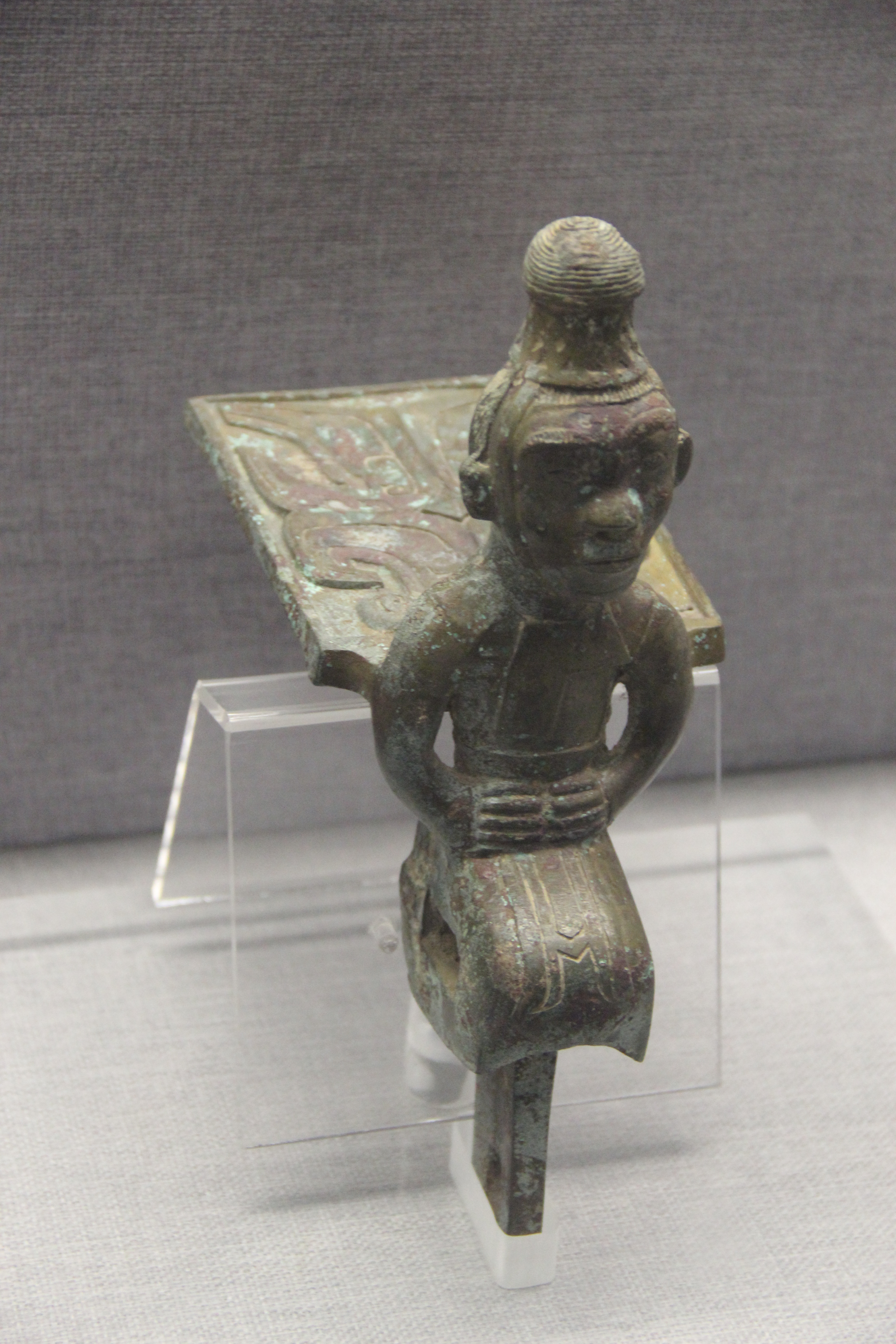
Western Zhou (c. 9th century BCE) bronze chariot ornament of a man wearing a juling (矩领, "square collar") robe and an early type of guan.

Following the Shang dynasty, the Western Zhou dynasty established new system of etiquette and rites on clothing, placing new ceremonial, political and cultural significance on clothing. This tied fashion to the rites and culture of its people, which became the basis for the Li (禮) orthodoxy of Confucianism that dominated East Asian culture for 2000 years. In reference to this, Ruist writings such as Kong Yingda's "True Meaning of Chunqiu- Zuo zhuan" suggest that the term huaxia (華夏) referred to both the ceremonial etiquettes of the central states and the clothing that those states' denizens wore.

Principle of this practice was the standardization of a garment style called Shangyi Xiachang (上衣下裳, "upper top, and lower garnment", meaning separating the upper and lower garments into two items). Though the fashion gradually evolved and was replaced by styles such as shenyi, the Shangyi Xiachang still maintained as the basis for formal and ceremonial wear such as the mianfu and chaofu. This created a strict hierarchical society that used clothing as a status meridian, and inevitably, the height of one's rank influenced the ornateness of a costume. Costumes would also be distinguished by their ceremonial usage. This became the antecedent for the complex system of clothing for all succeeding eras and dynasties. Importance were hence placed on items such as the guan and mianfu, as recorded in Rites of Zhou and Book of Rites. The guan was used to distinguish social ranks; the use of guan was one of the distinctive features of the Hanfu system, and men could only wear it after the Adulthood ceremony known as Guan Li. Other markers of status included the fabric materials, the shape, size, colour of the clothing, the decorative pattern, the length of a skirt, the wideness of a sleeve, and the degree of ornamentation. There were strict regulations on the clothing of the emperor, feudal dukes, senior officials, soldiers, ancestor worshippers, brides, and mourners.

The mianfu was the most distinguished type of formal dress, worn for worshipping and memorial ceremonies; it had a complex structure and there were various decorations which bore symbolic meaning; there were six ranked types of mianfu which were worn by emperors, princes and officials according to their titles. The emperors also wore bianfu (only second to mianfu) when meeting with officials or if they had to work on official business. When the emperor were not at court, they wore the xuanduan. Xuanduan could also worn by princes during sacrificial occasions and by scholars who would go pay respect to their parents in the morning. The mianfu, bianfu, and xuanduan all consisted of four separate parts: a skirt underneath, a robe in the middle, a bixi on top, and a long cloth belt dadai (Chinese: 大带). Similarly to the Western Zhou dynasty, the dress code of the early Eastern Zhou dynasty was governed by strict rules which was used maintain social order and to distinguish social class.

In addition to these class-oriented developments, the daily hanfu in this period became slightly looser while maintaining the basic form the Shang dynasty in the wearing of yichang. Broad and narrow sleeves both co-existed. The yi was closed with a sash which was tied around the waist; jade decorations were sometimes hung from the sash. The length of the skirts and ku could vary from knee-length to ground-length. Common people in the Zhou dynasty, including the minority groups in Southwest China, wore hemp-based clothing.

The Zhou dynasty also formalized women's wearing of ji with a coming-of-age ceremony called Ji Li, which was performed after a girl was engaged and the wearing of ji showed a girl was already promised to a marriage. Men could also wear ji alone, however more commonly men wore ji with the guan to fix the headwear.

This ritual marked a significant transition from childhood to adulthood, symbolizing a woman's readiness for marriage and her new responsibilities within society. The evolution of these hairpins, from simple Ji to more elaborate Zan, often reflected changes in dynastic styles and the increasing artistry of Chinese jewelry. Materials such as jade, sandalwood, and precious metals were chosen not only for their aesthetic appeal but also for their cultural and symbolic significance, representing virtues, connection to nature, or status. [1]

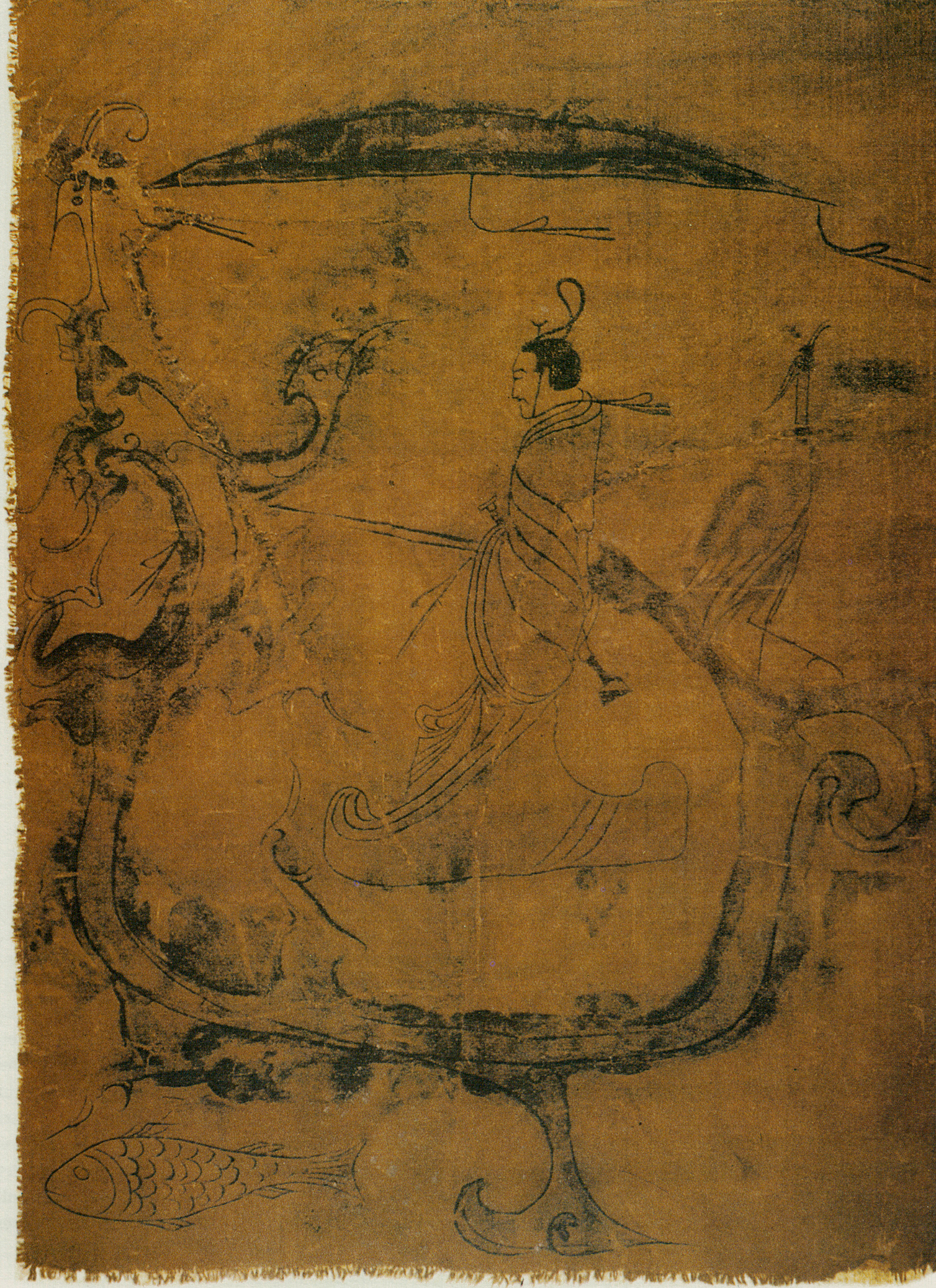
Eastern Zhou silk painting featuring a man wearing shenyi and a guan with a dragon.

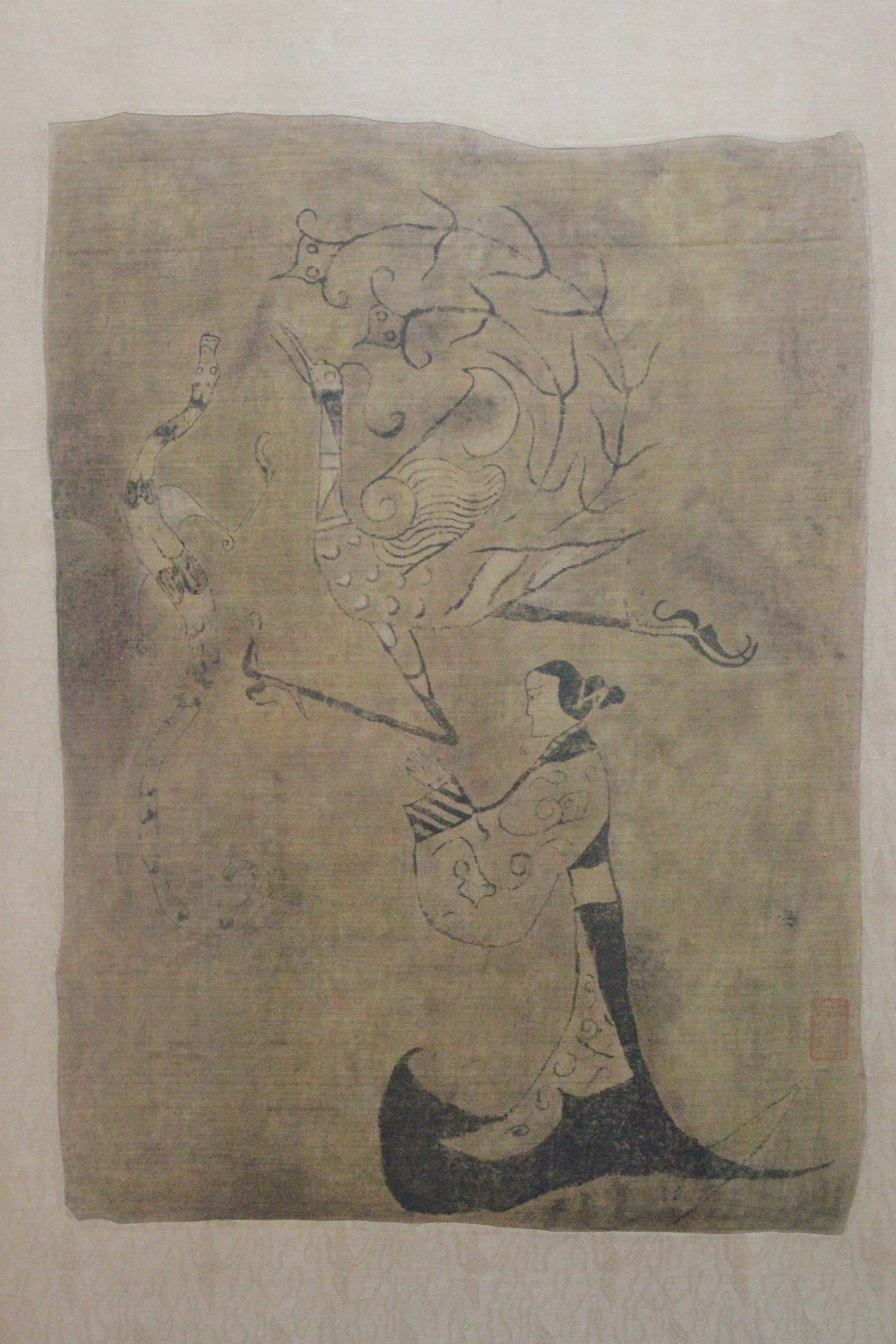
Woman wearing a shenyi (side view), from the Silk painting with female figure, dragon and phoenix patterns

=== Spring and Autumn period, Warring States period ===
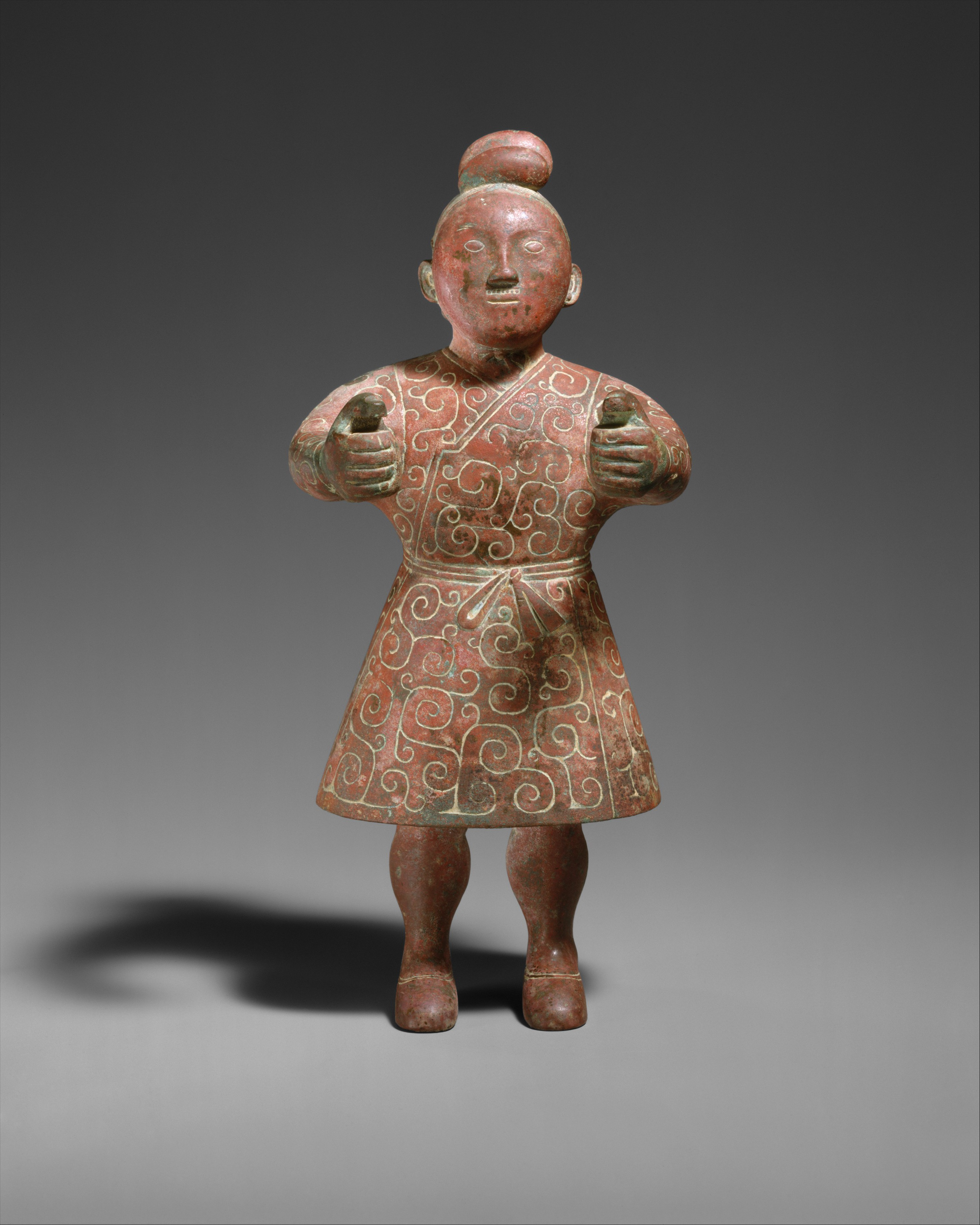
Charioteer figure wearing a short juling paofu, Eastern Zhou dynasty.

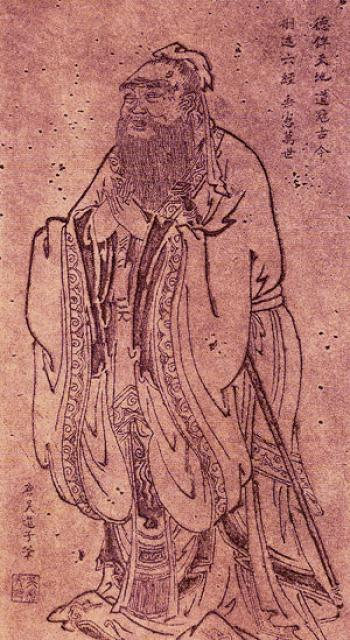
8th century depiction of Confucius donning what was perceived as typical fashion of pre-imperial China

During the Spring and Autumn period and the Warring States period, numerous schools of thought emerged in China, including Confucianism; those different schools of thoughts naturally influenced the development of the clothing. Moreover, due to the frequent wars occurring during the Warring States period, various etiquette were slowly revoked. Eastern Zhou dynasty dress code started to erode by the middle of Warring States period. Later, many regions decided not to follow the system of Zhou dynasty; the clothing during this period were differentiated among the seven major states (i.e. the states of Chu, Han, Qin, Wei, Yan, Qi and Zhao). Moreover, the year 307 B.C. also marked an important year with the first reform of the military uniform implemented by King Wuling of Zhao. This reform, commonly referred to as Hufuqishe, required all Zhao soldiers to wear the Hufu-style uniforms of the Donghu, Linhu and Loufan people in battle to facilitate fighting capability. The hedangku with a loose rise was then introduced.

Based on the archaeological artifacts dating from the Eastern Zhou dynasty, ordinary men, peasants and labourers, were wearing a long youren yi with narrow-sleeves, with a narrow silk band called sitao (Chinese: 丝套) being knotted at the waist over the top. The youren yi was also worn with ku (in a style generally referred as shanku) to allow greater ease of movement, but was made of plain cloth instead of silk cloth. The shanku of this period also influenced the Hufu. Aristocratic figures did not wear those kind of clothing however, they were wearing wider-sleeved long paofu which was belted at the waist; one example can be seen from the wooden figures from a Xingyang Warring States period tomb. (Note: For wooden figures from a Xingyang warring-state period tomb, see external links.) The youren closures could be found in different shapes, such as jiaoling youren and quju youren.

Skirts also appear to have been worn during the Warring States period based on archaeological artifacts and sculpted bronze figures, and was worn in the shanqun or ruqun. (Note: In this context, the shanqun refers to the upper garment covering the skirt, while ruqun refers to the covering of upper garment by the skirt.) An archeological example of a bronze figure wearing shanqun is the bronze armed warrior holding up chime bells from the Tomb of Marquis Yi of Zeng. A dark yellow-skirt, dating from the late Warring States period, was also found in the Chu Tomb (M1) at the Mashan site in Jiangling County, Hubei province.

Ruqun
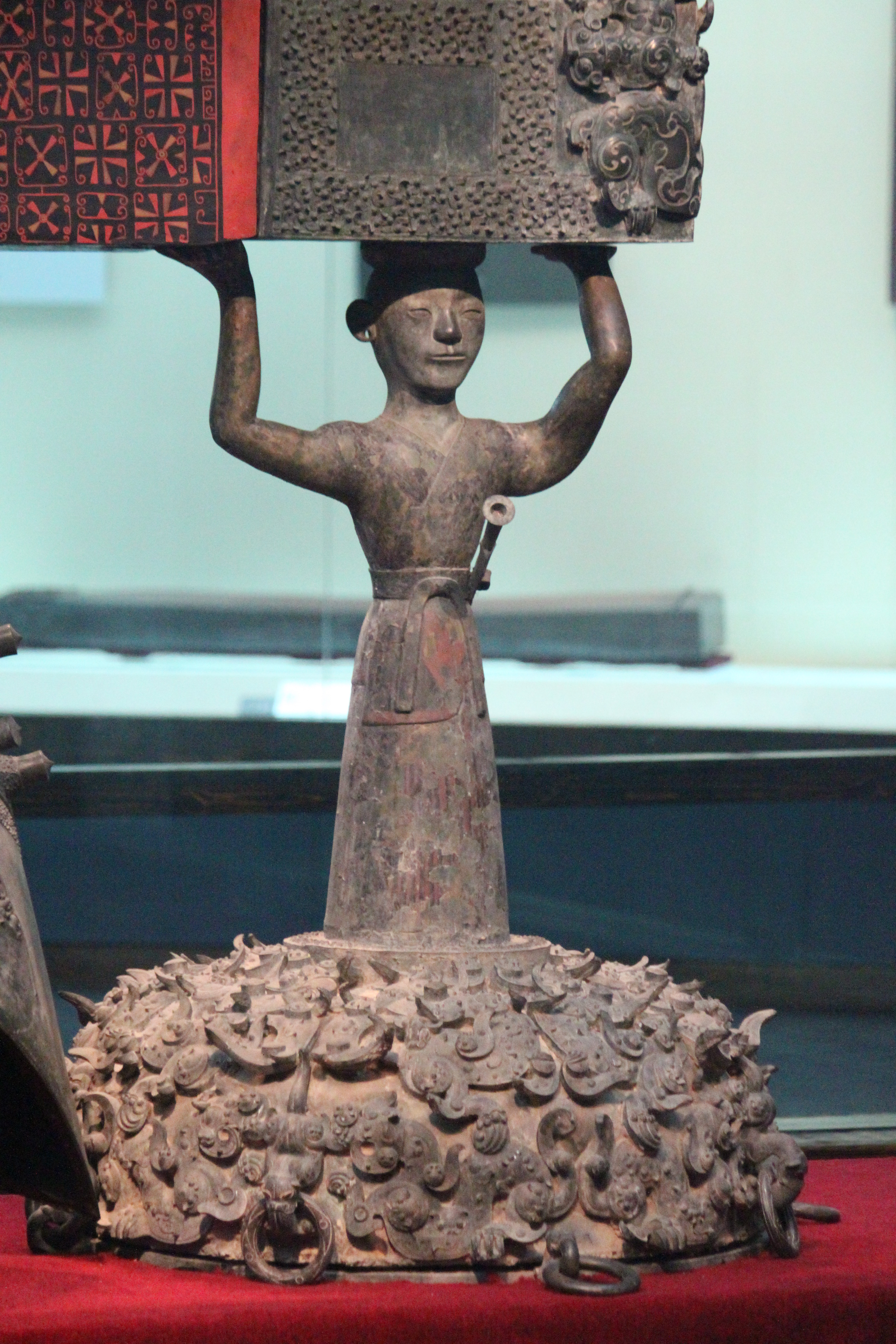
A warrior wearing a quju youren shanqun, Tomb of Marquis Yi of Zeng, Warring States Period, 6th century BC

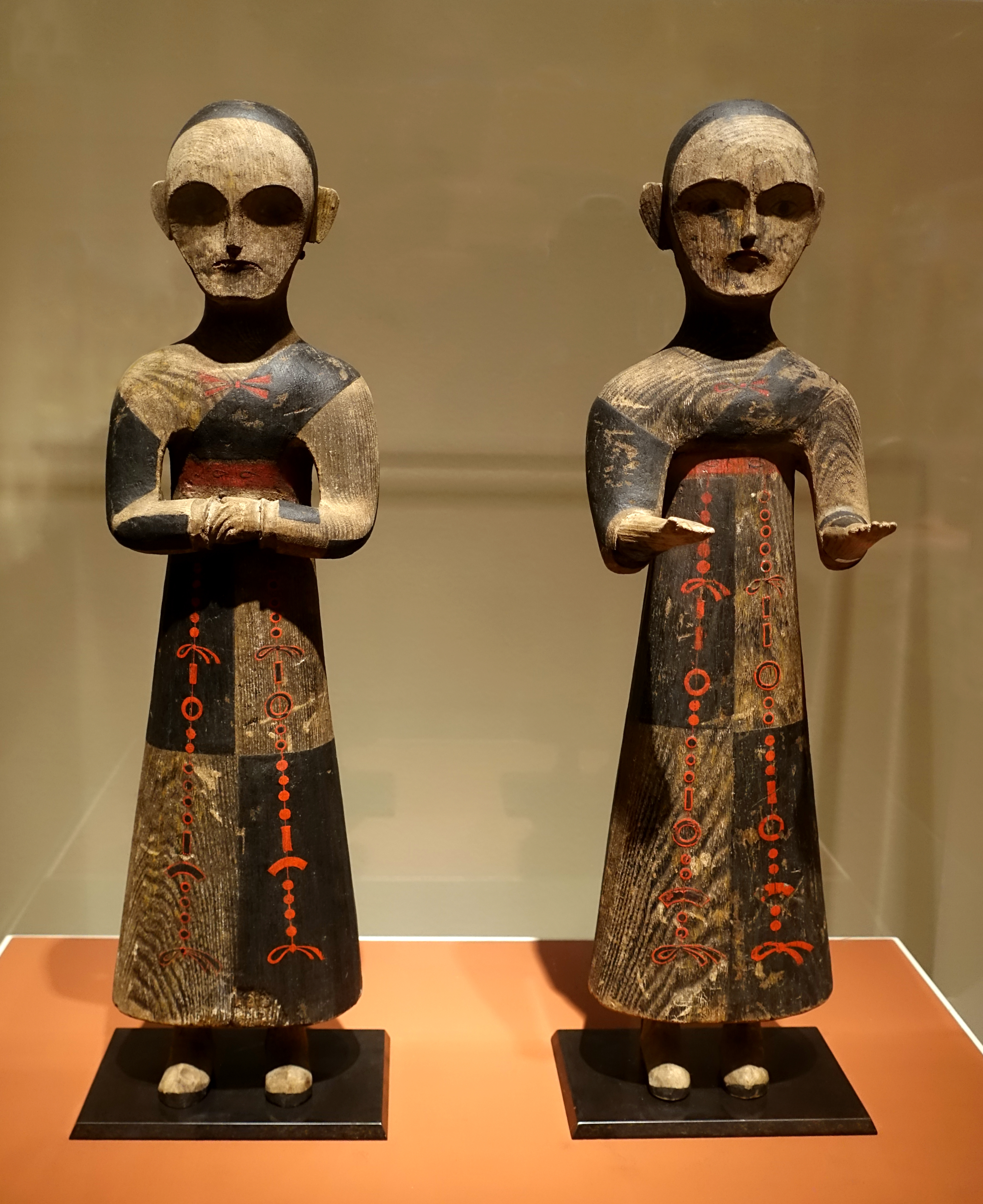
Shamans wearing jiaoling yoren ruqun, Chu culture, Warring States period, 4th–3rd century BC
Shenyi
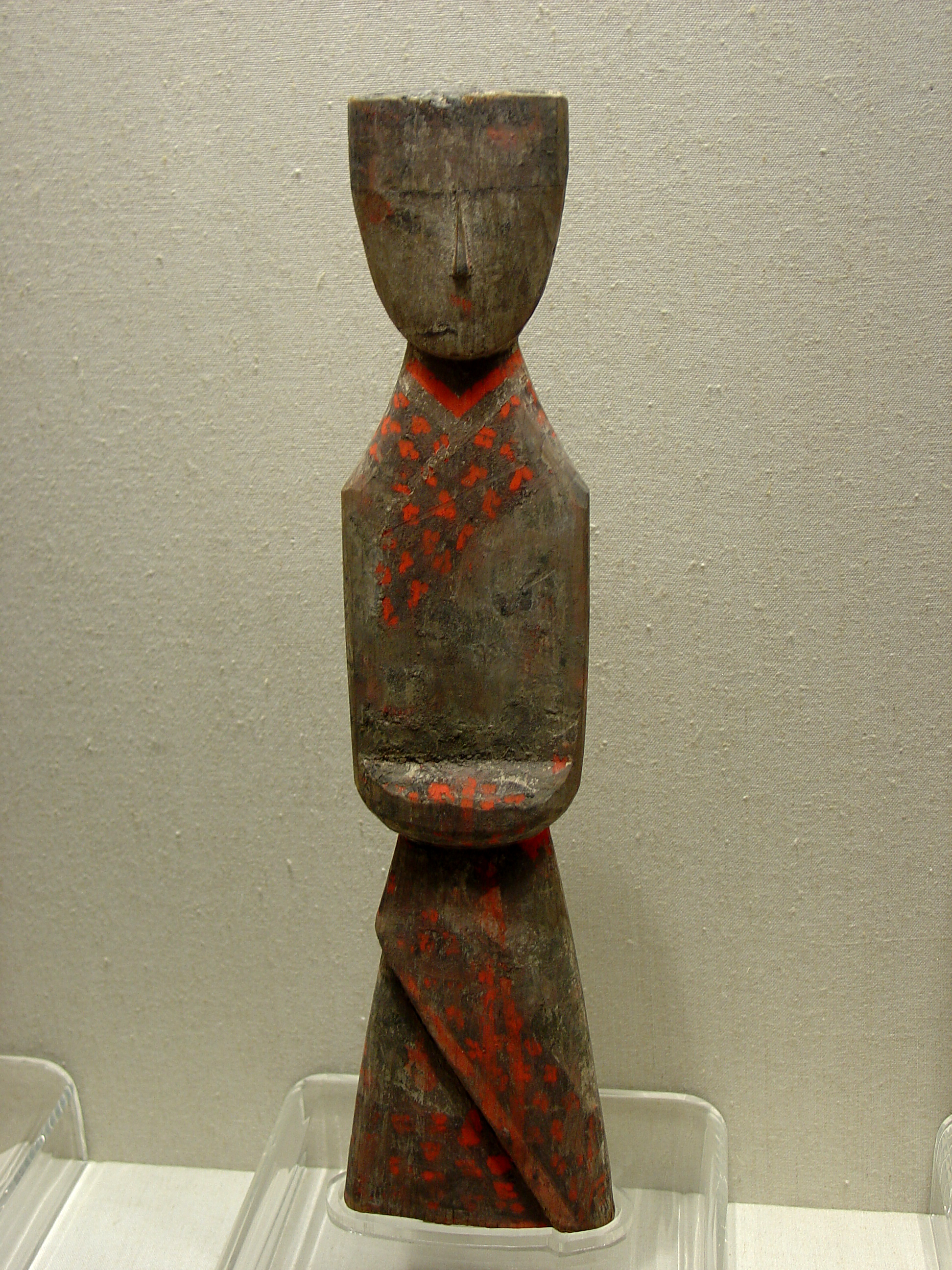
Attendant wearing a qujupao shenyi, a typical clothing of its period, Warring States Period

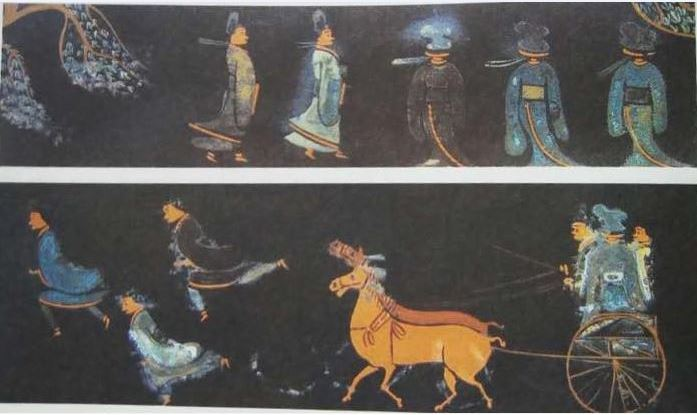
Women and men wearing shenyi, Jingmen Tomb of the State of Chu (1030–223 BC)

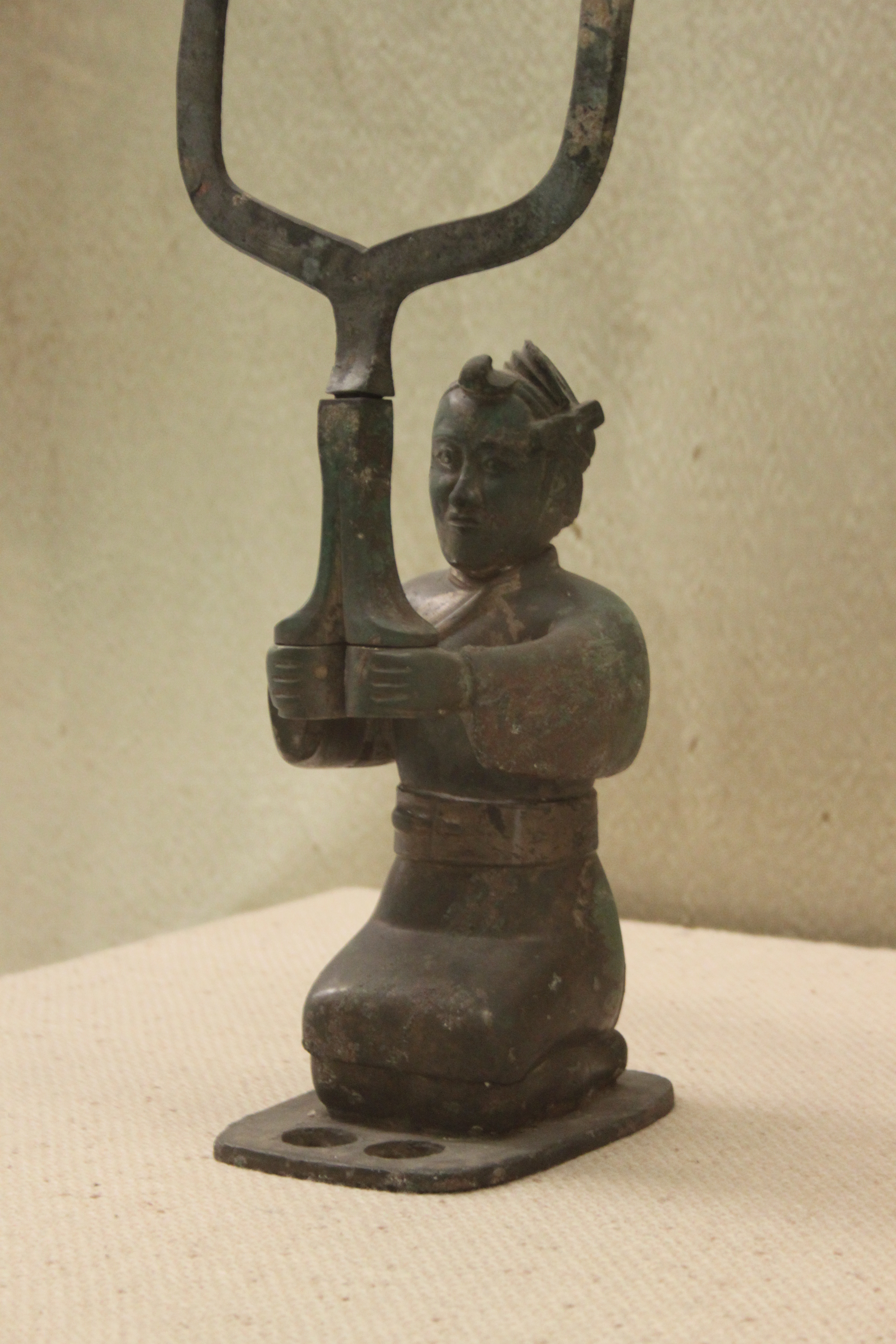
A bronze oil lamp stand shaped like a man in shenyi, Warring States.

During the Warring States period, the shenyi was also developed. The qujupao, a type of shenyi which wrapped in a spiral effect and had fuller sleeves, was found to be worn by tomb figurines of the same period. Unearthed clothing from tombs show that the shenyi was worn by aristocrats in the state of Chu. The increased popularity of the shenyi may have been partially due to the influence of Confucianism. The shenyi remained the dominant form of Hanfu from the Zhou dynasty to the Qin dynasty and further to the Han dynasty.

=== Qin dynasty ===
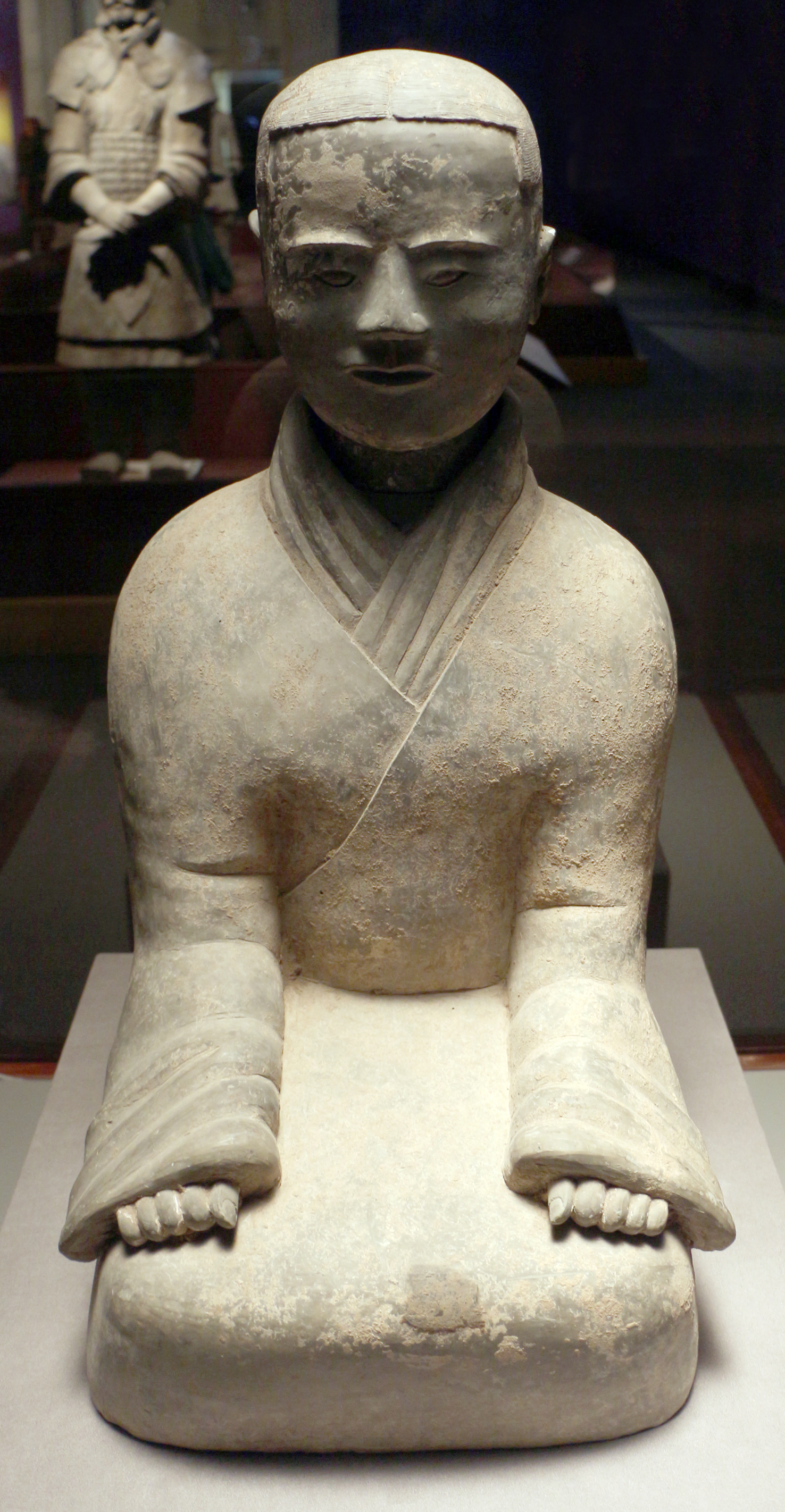
A kneeling figurine wearing shenyi or jiaolingpao, Qin dynasty.

Although the Qin dynasty was short-lived, it set up a series of systems that impacted the later generations greatly. Following the unification of the seven states, Emperor Qin Shihuang ordered his people, regardless of distance and class, to follow a series of regulations in all forms of cultural aspects, including clothing. The clothing style in Qin was therefore unitary. The Qin dynasty adopted a coloured-clothing system, which stipulated people who held higher position (officials of the third rank and above) wore green shenyi while common people wore normal white shenyi. The Han Chinese wore the shenyi as a formal dress and was worn together with a guan and shoes. The Qin dynasty also abolished Zhou dynasty's mianfu ranking system, replaced with a uniform type of black shenyi called junxuan(袀玄) and tongtianguan instead of the mianguan for the emperor, with the officials following suit and wearing the same black robes. In court, the officials wore hats, loose robes with carving knives hanging from the waist, holding hu, and stuck ink brush between head and ears. There was an increase in the popularity of robes with large sleeves with cuff laces among men.

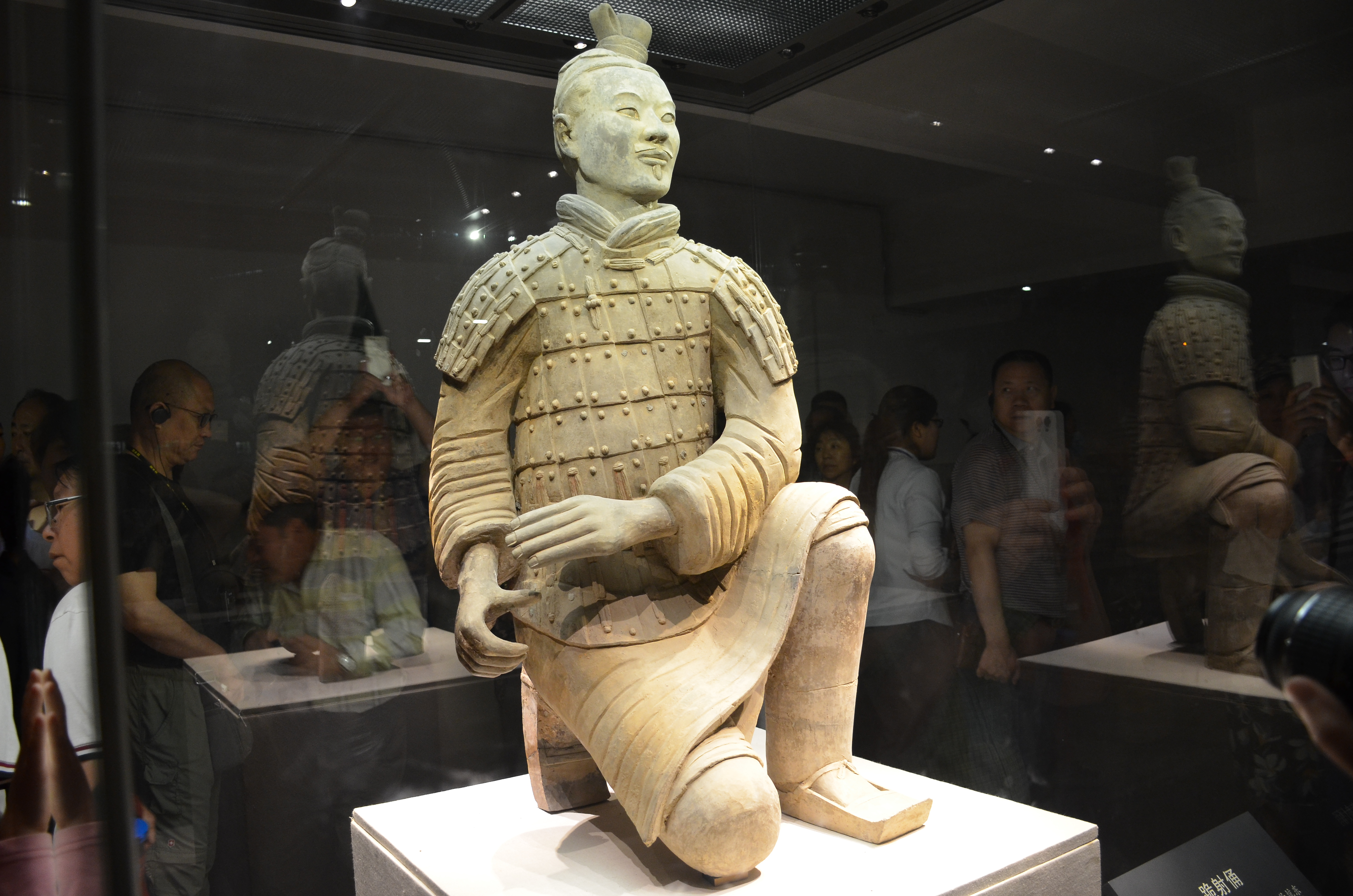
A kneeling Terracotta Army archer wearing with a shirt, an armoured jacket, a short skirt with underneath trousers, and a shallow-mouth shoes, Qin dynasty

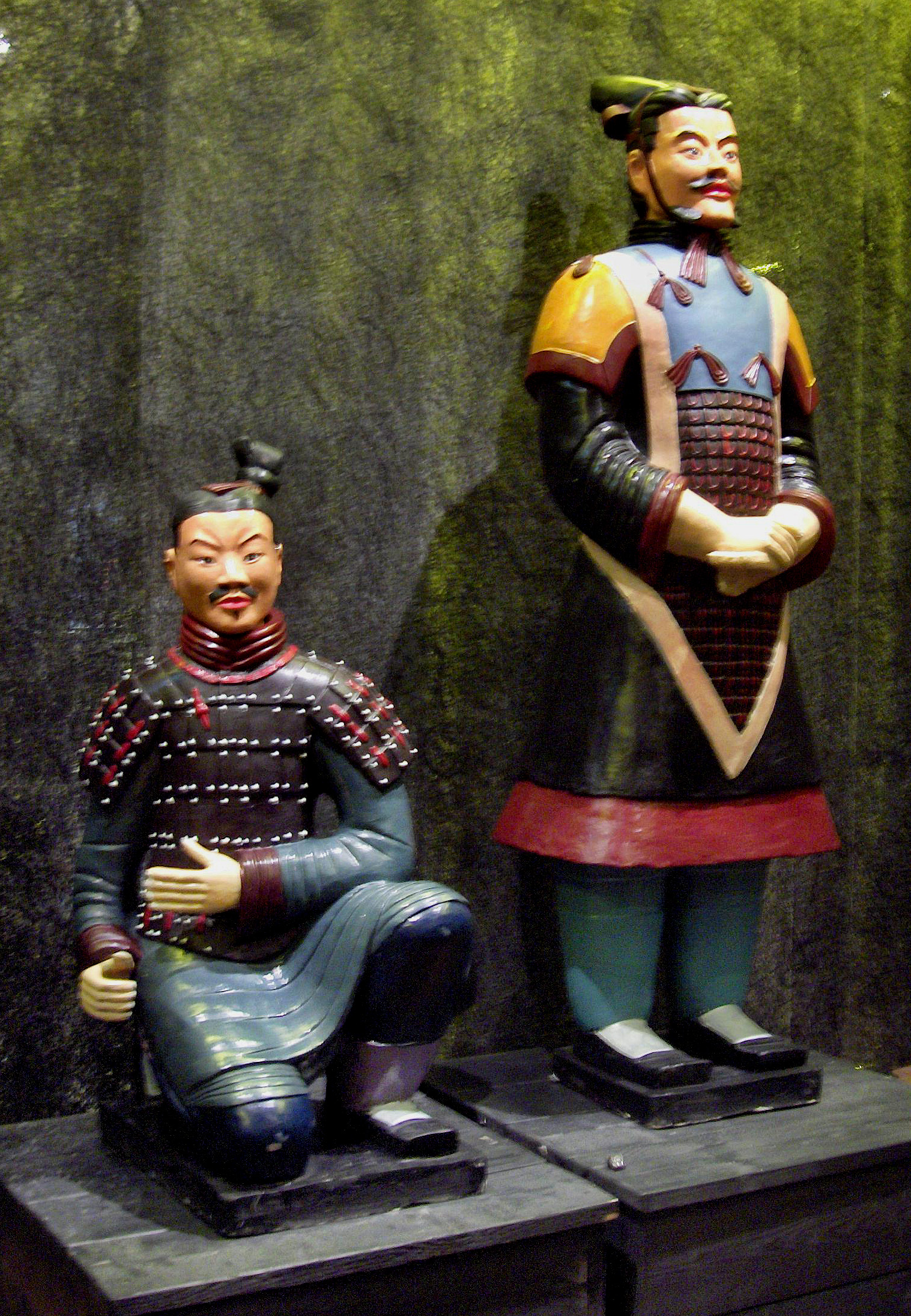
Terracotta Army soldiers in colours wearing shangru under their daru with ku trousers, Qin dynasty.

In ordinary times, men wore ruku whereas the women wore ruqun. Merchants, regardless of their wealth, were never allowed to wear clothing made of silk. The commoners and labourers wore jiaolingpao with narrow sleeves, trousers, and skirts; they braided their hairs or simply wore skull caps and kerchiefs. The making of different kinds of qun (裙; 'skirt'; called xie (衺) in Qin dynasty), shangru (上襦; 'jacket'), daru (大襦; 'outwear') and ku-trousers is recorded in a Qin dynasty's bamboo slip called Zhiyi (制衣; 'Making clothes'). The Terracotta Army also show the differences between soldiers and officers' clothing wherein the elites wore long gown while all the commoners wore shorter jackets; they also wore headgears which ranged from simple head cloths to formal official caps. Cavalry riders were also depicted wearing long-sleeved, hip-length jackets and padded trousers.

=== Han dynasty ===
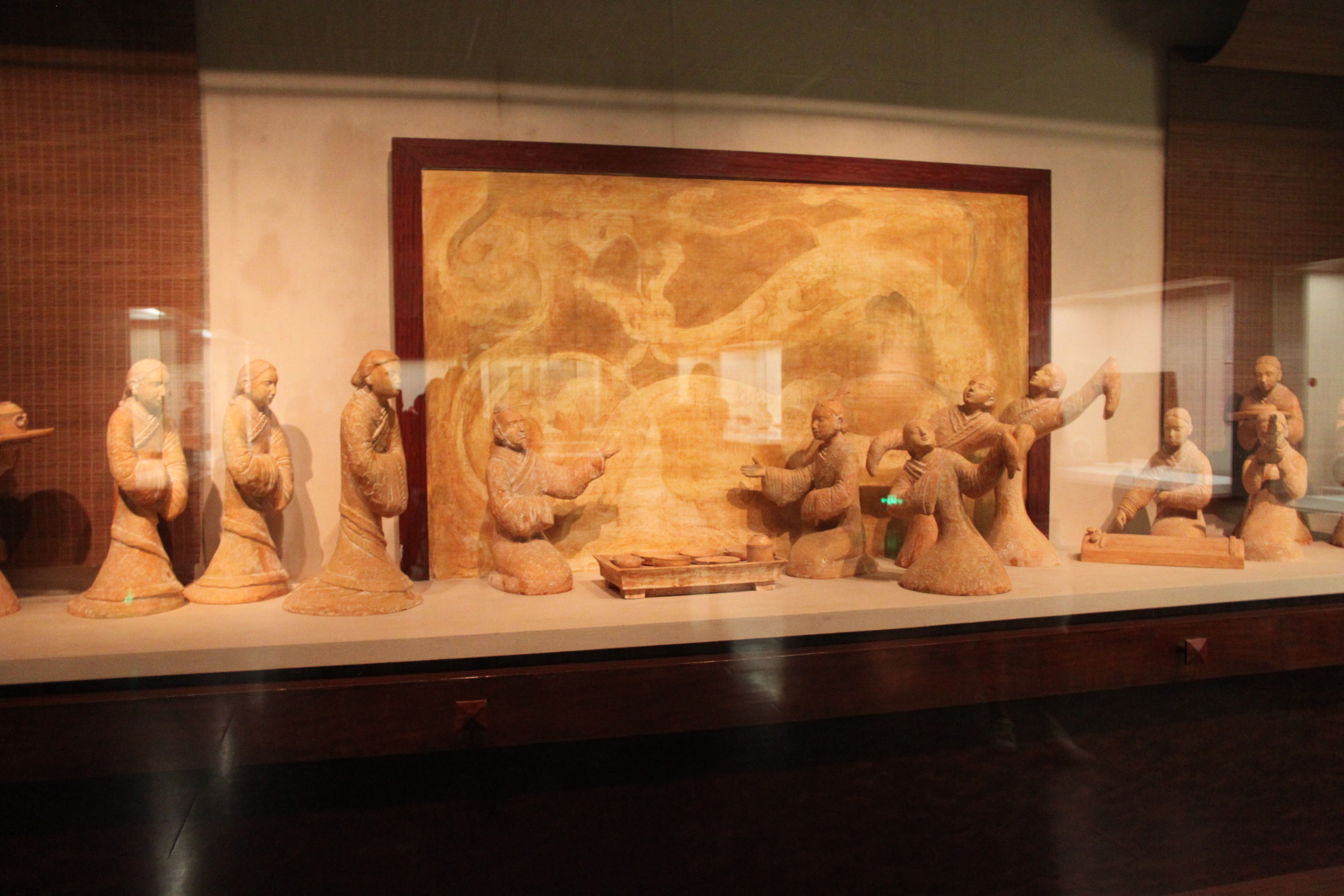
Banqueting and dancing figurines in Han style Shenyi, the colouring has mostly decayed; 2nd century BCE

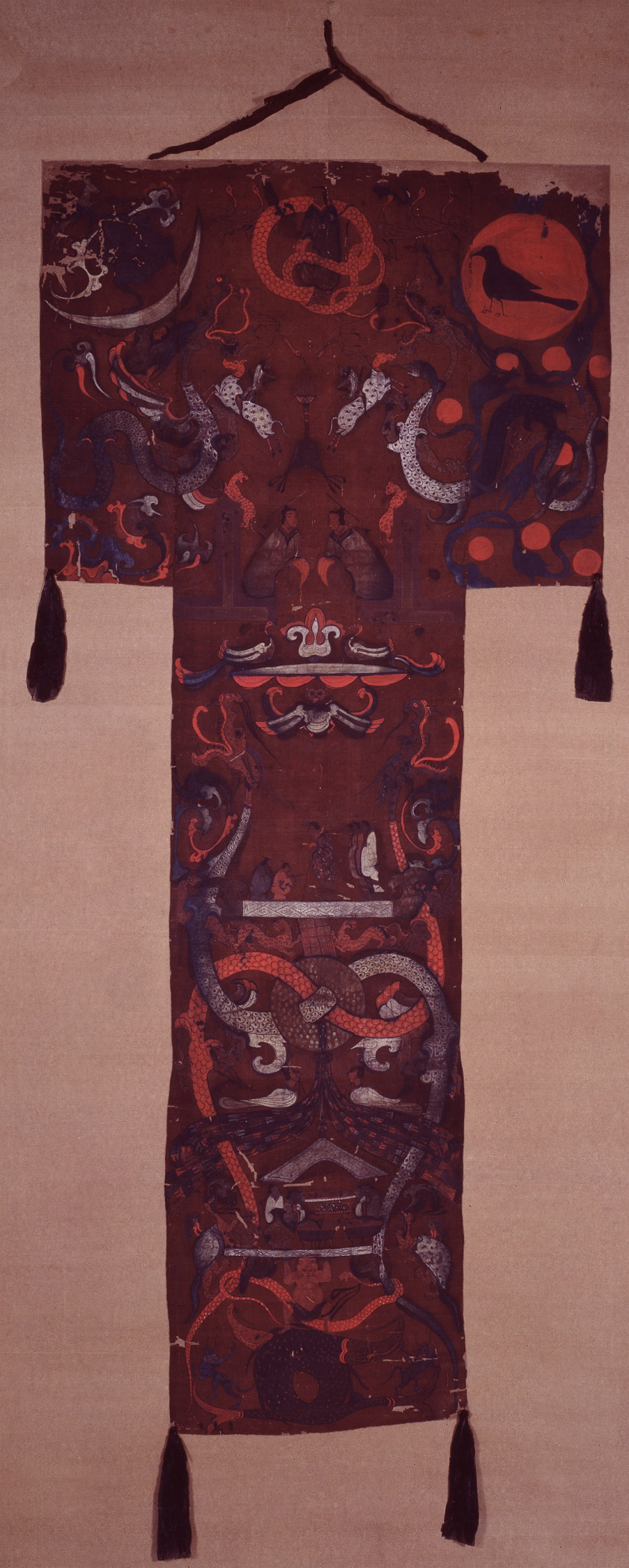
Sericulture and silk embroidery reached a new high in the Han

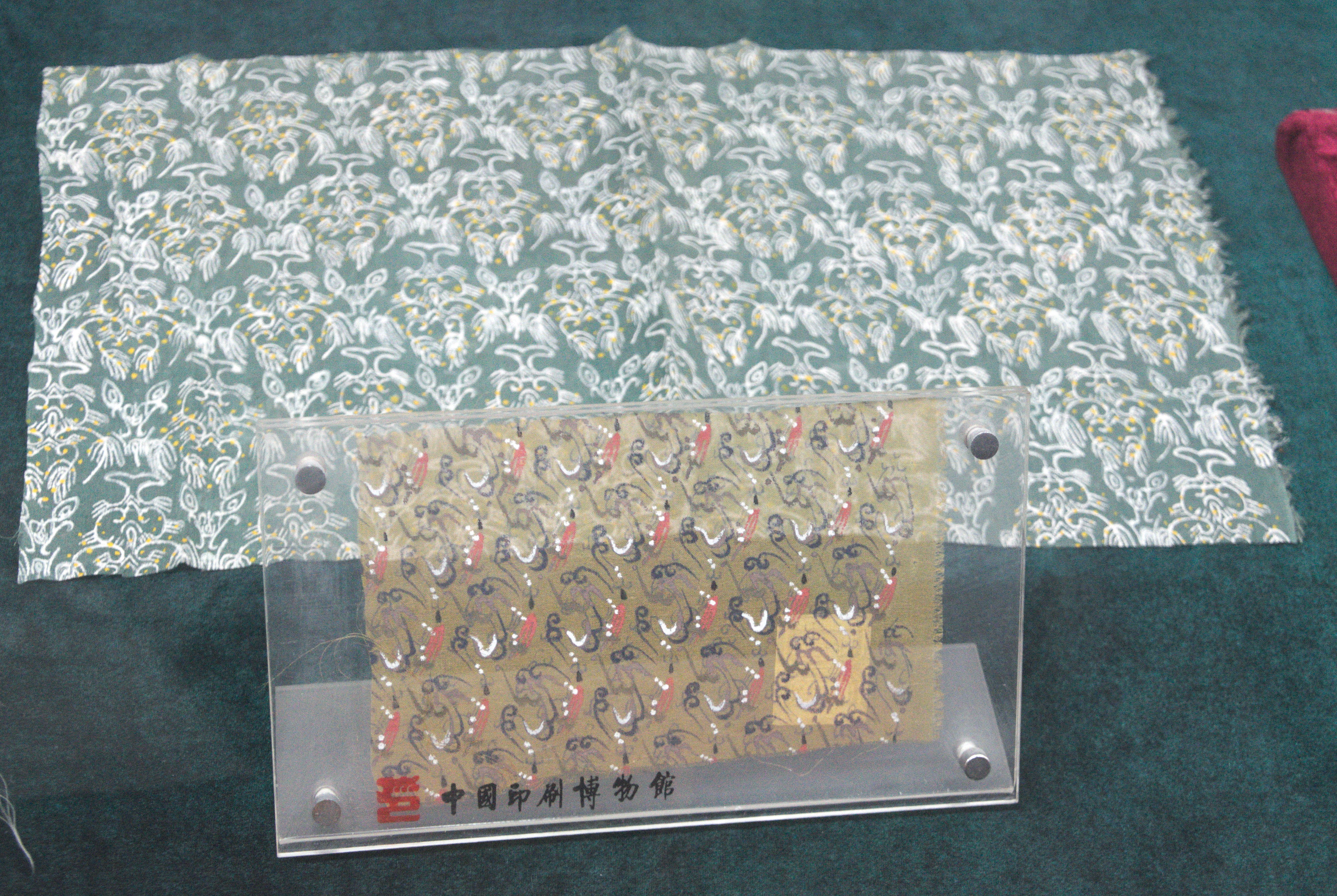
Silk with intricate hand drawn motif; Mawangdui, 2nd century BCE

By the time of Han dynasty, the shenyi remained popular and developed further into two types: qujupao and zhijupao. The robes appeared to be similar, regardless of gender, in cut and construction: a wrap closure, held by a belt or a sash, with large sleeves gathered in a narrower cuff; however, the fabric, colours and ornaments of the robes were different between gender. However, later during the Eastern Han, very few people wore shenyi.

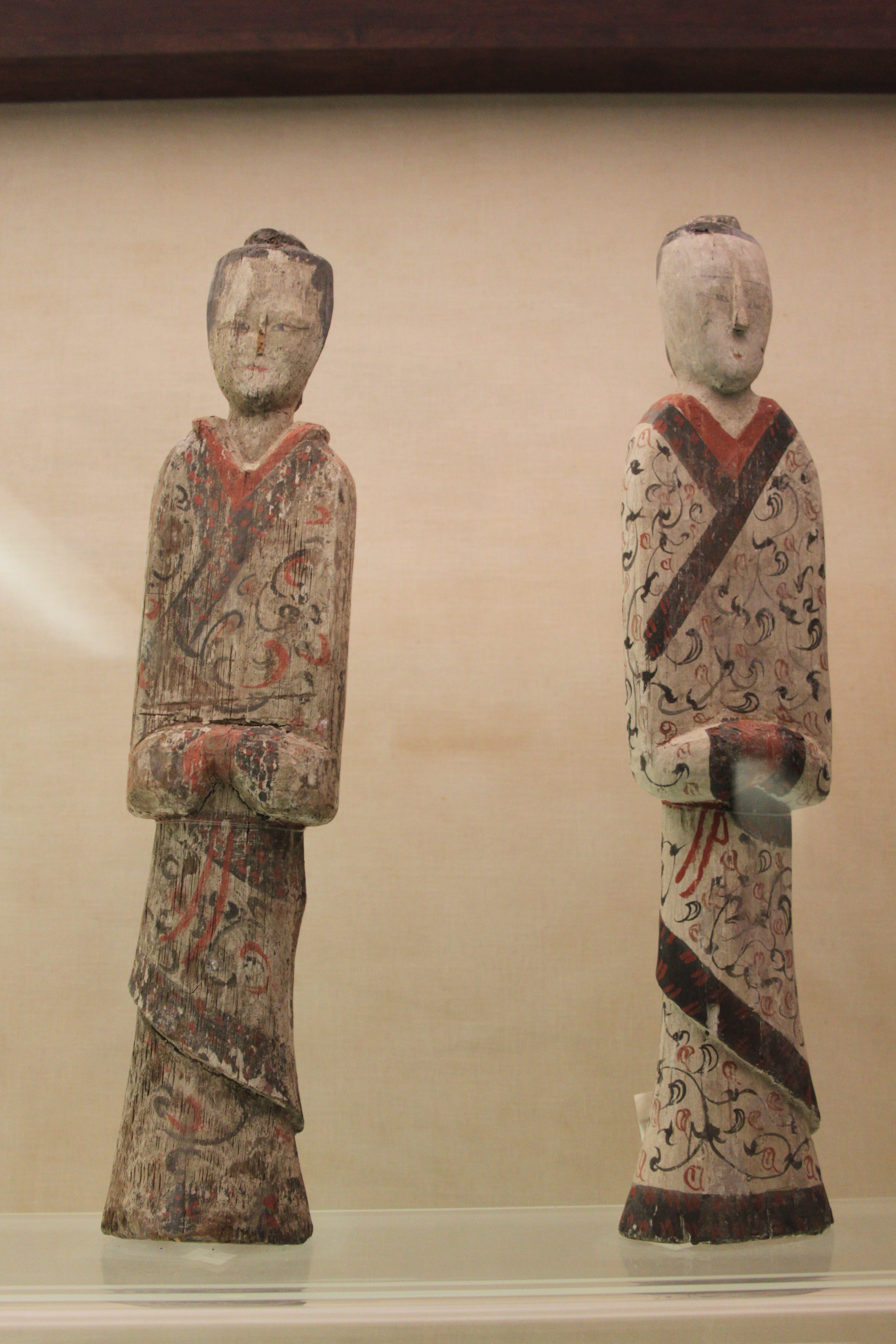
Mawangdui Painted Figurines wearing qujupao shenyi, Han dynasty

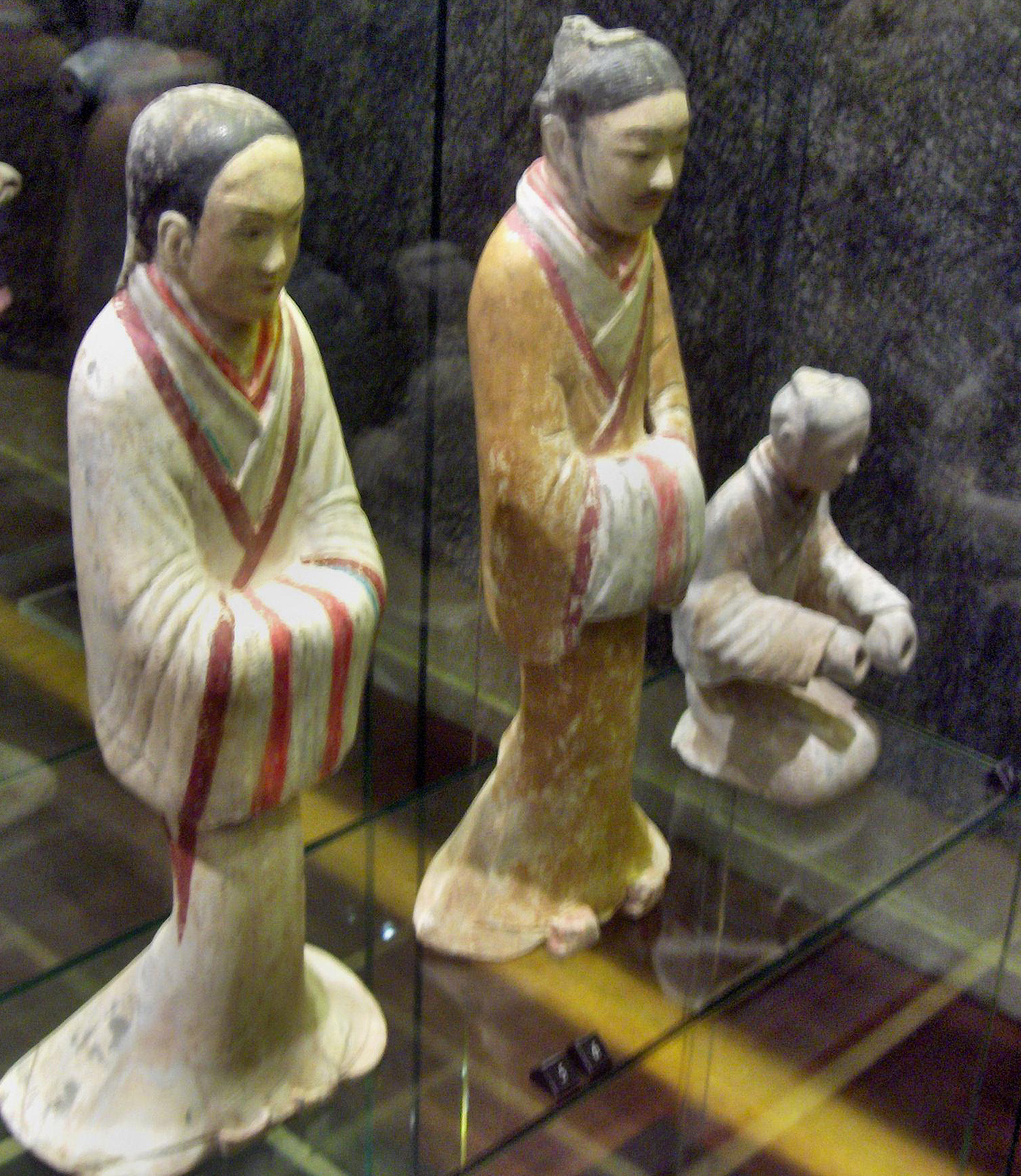
A female servant and a male advisor in Chinese shenyi, ceramic figurines from the Western Han period (202 BCE – 9 CE)

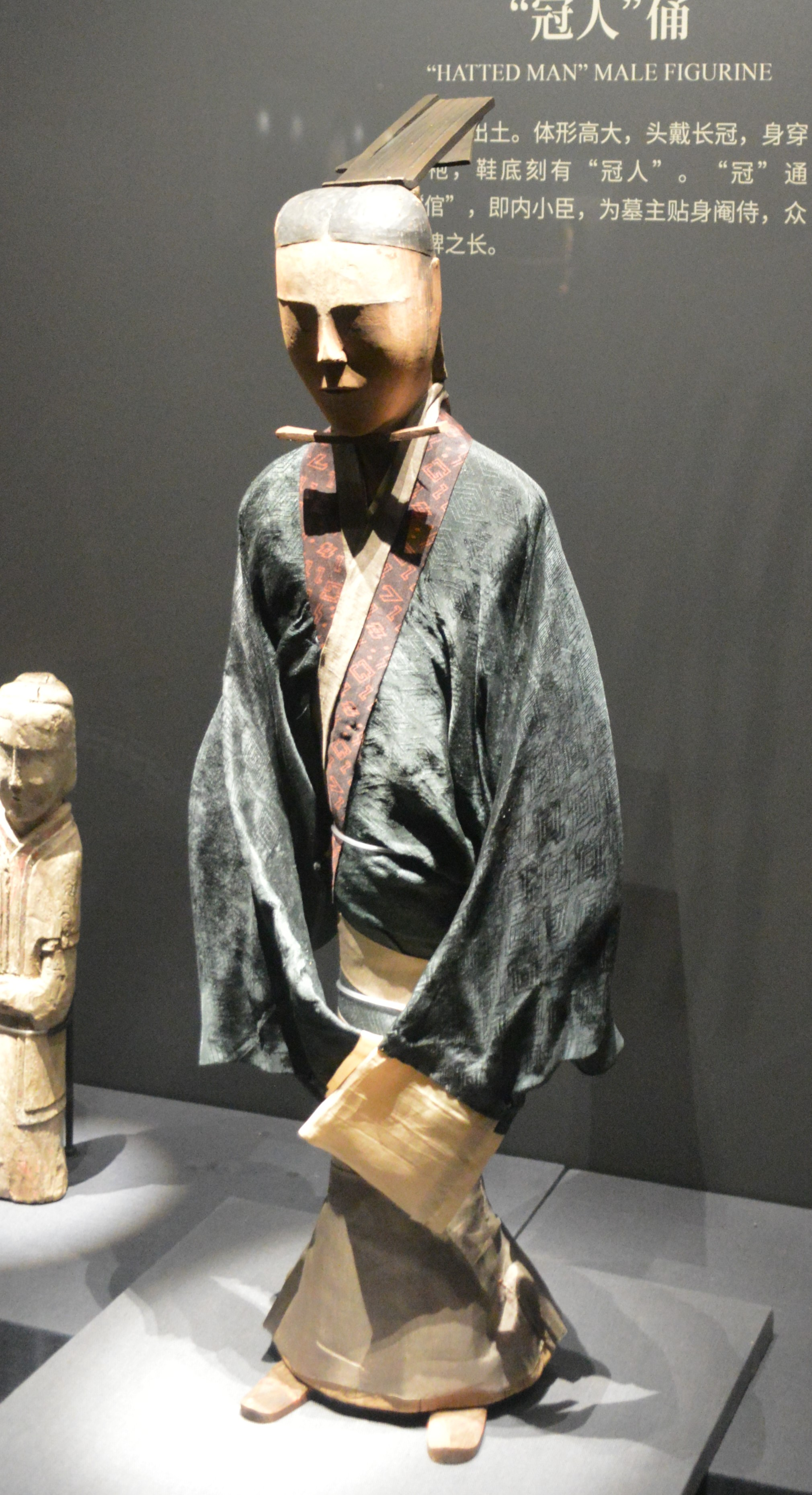
Wooden figurine of a male servant wearing a changguan(长冠) and shenyi.

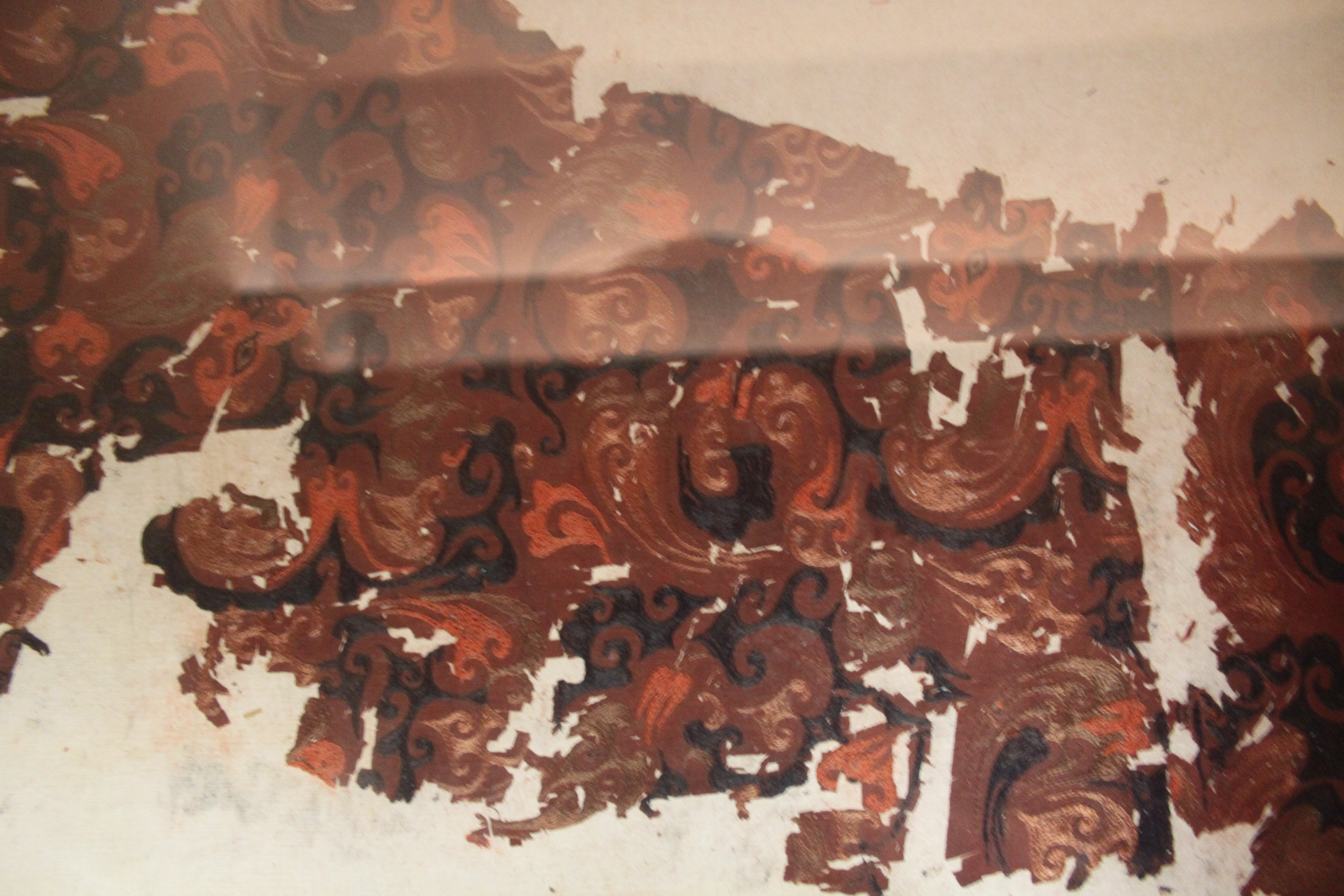
Silk from the Mawangdui tomb 2nd century BCE.

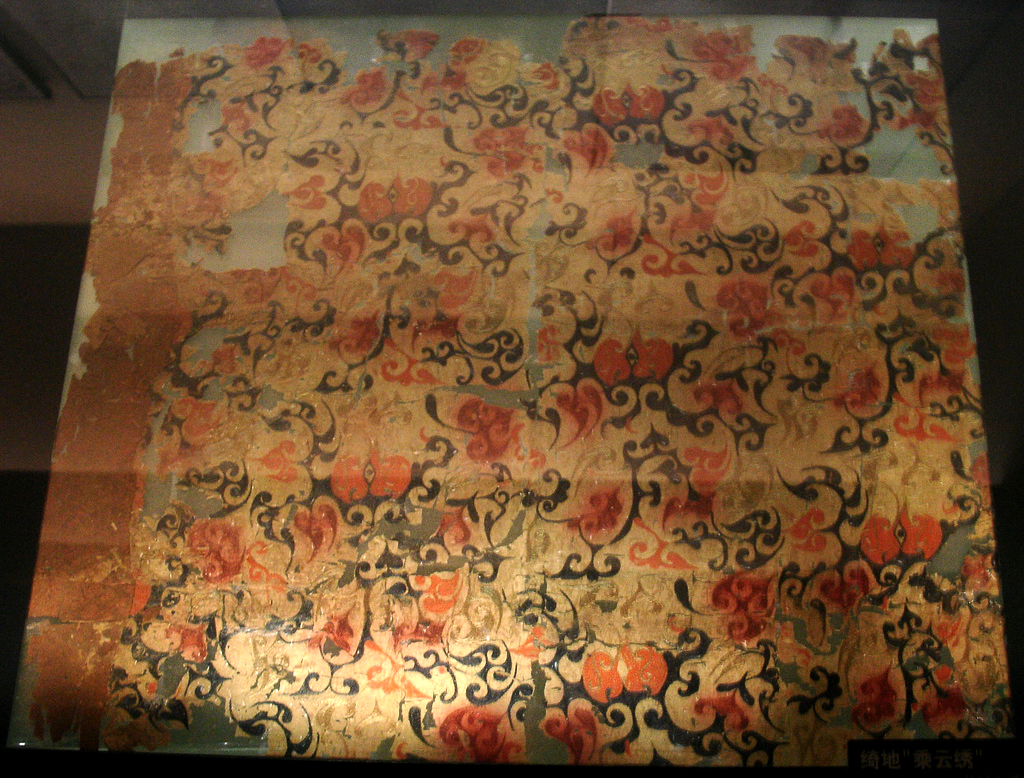
Flower-patterned silk piece; 2nd century BCE, Mawangdui.

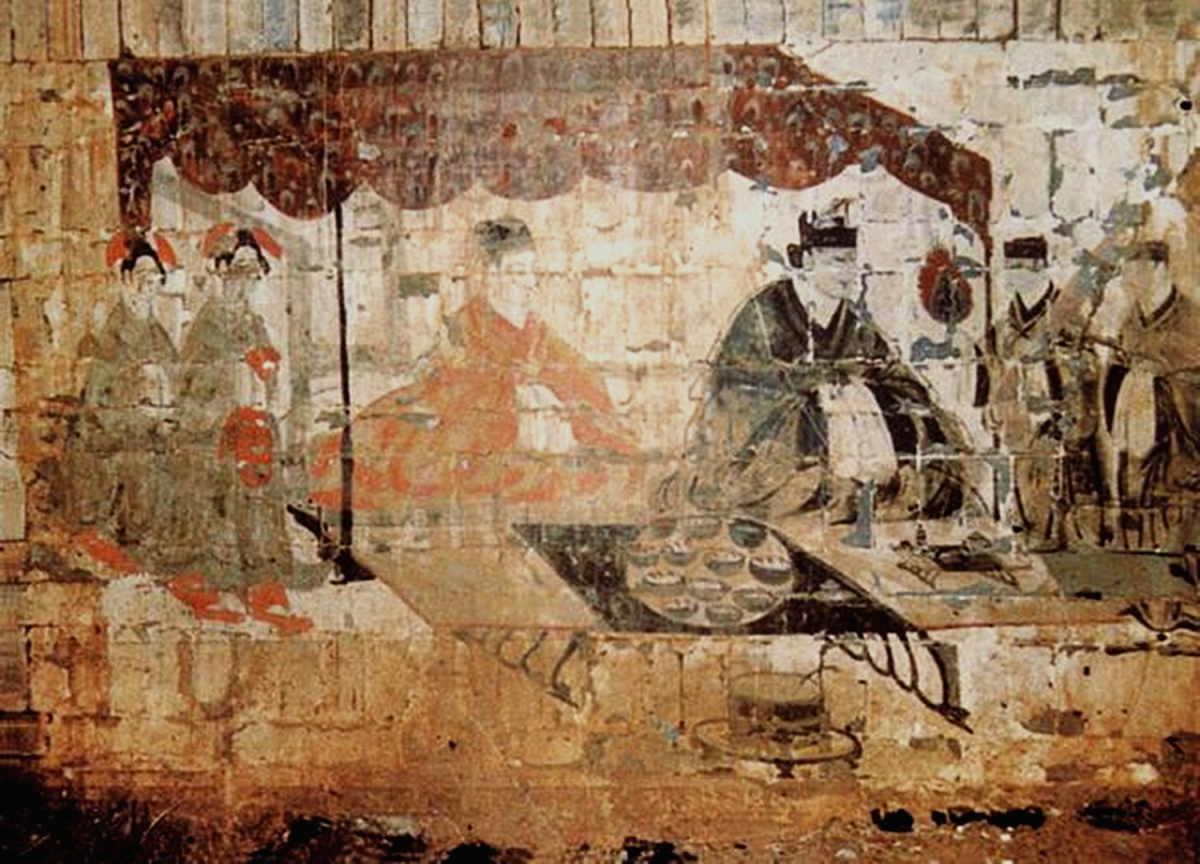
Eastern Han mural of husband and wife.

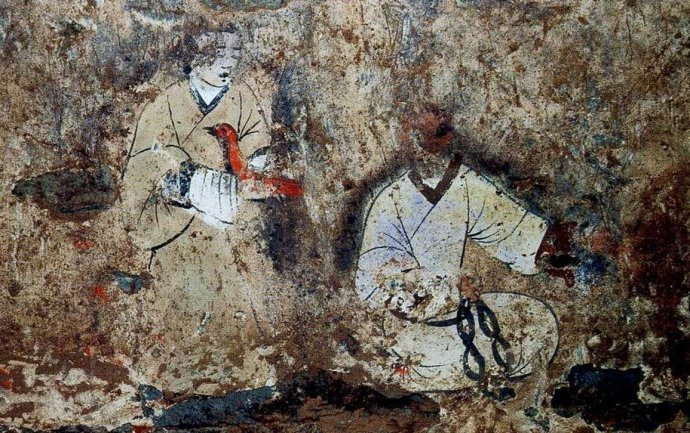
Fresco of two Men from a Western Han Dynasty Tomb in modern-day Xi'an, Shaanxi

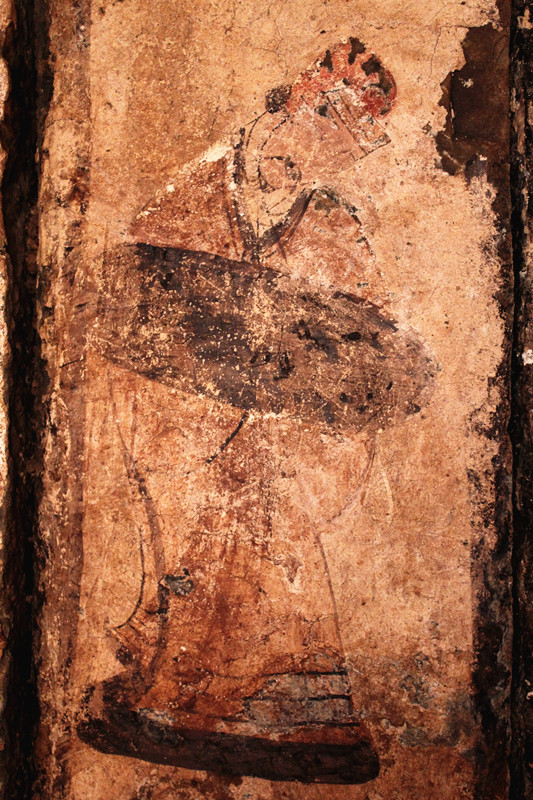
Mural painting of a male figure wearing wuguan (武冠), discovered in a Western Han dynasty (206 B.C. – 8 A.D.) tomb in Jinxiang County

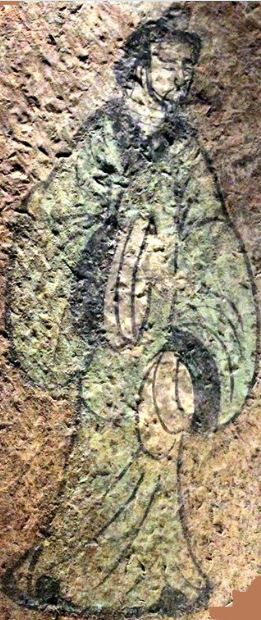
A man dressing in the Han dynasty style shenyi

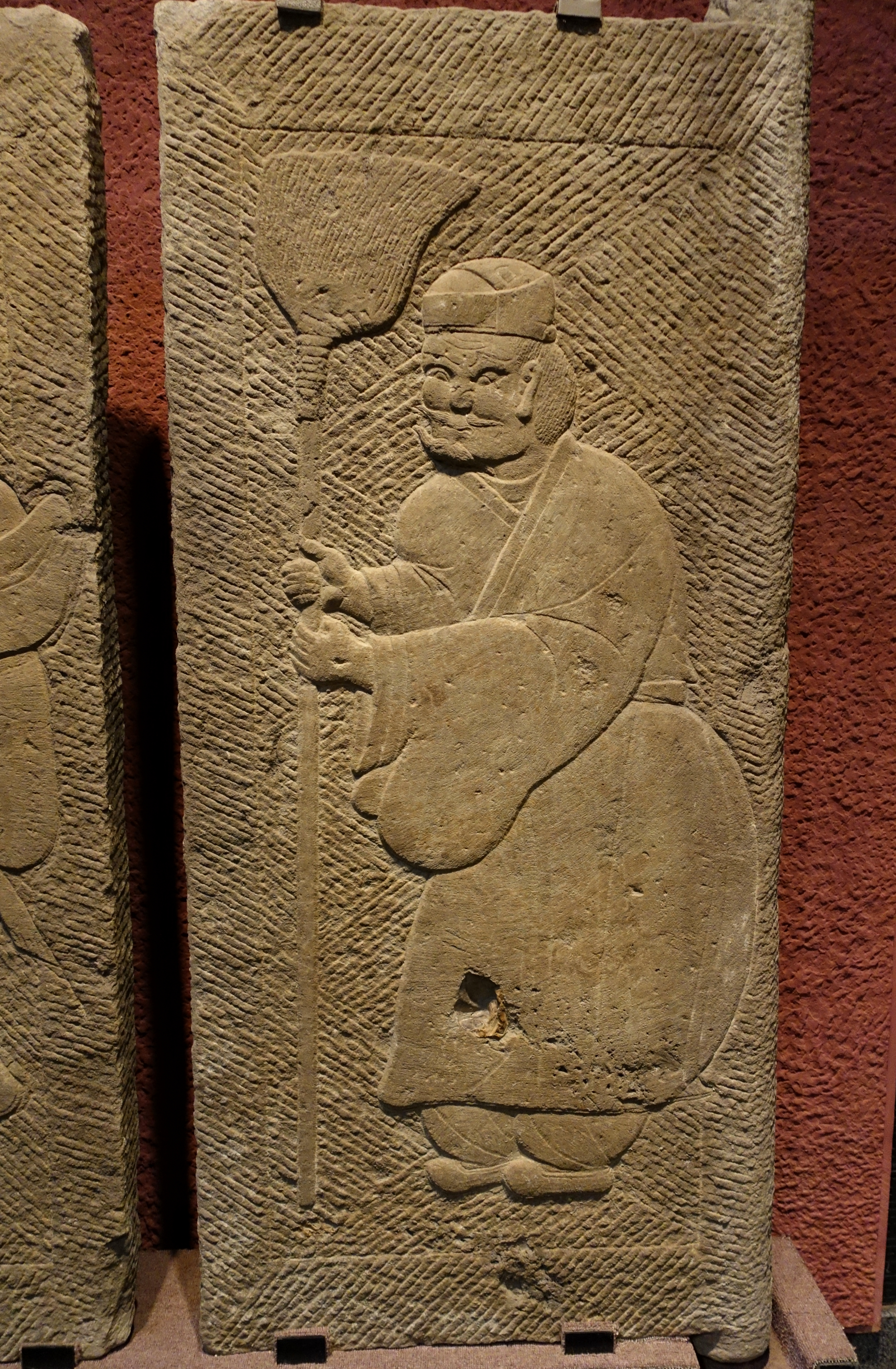
An Eastern Han carved stone tomb door showing a man wearing trousers underneath a long robe with a jinze hat, stored in Sichuan Provincial Museum in Chengdu

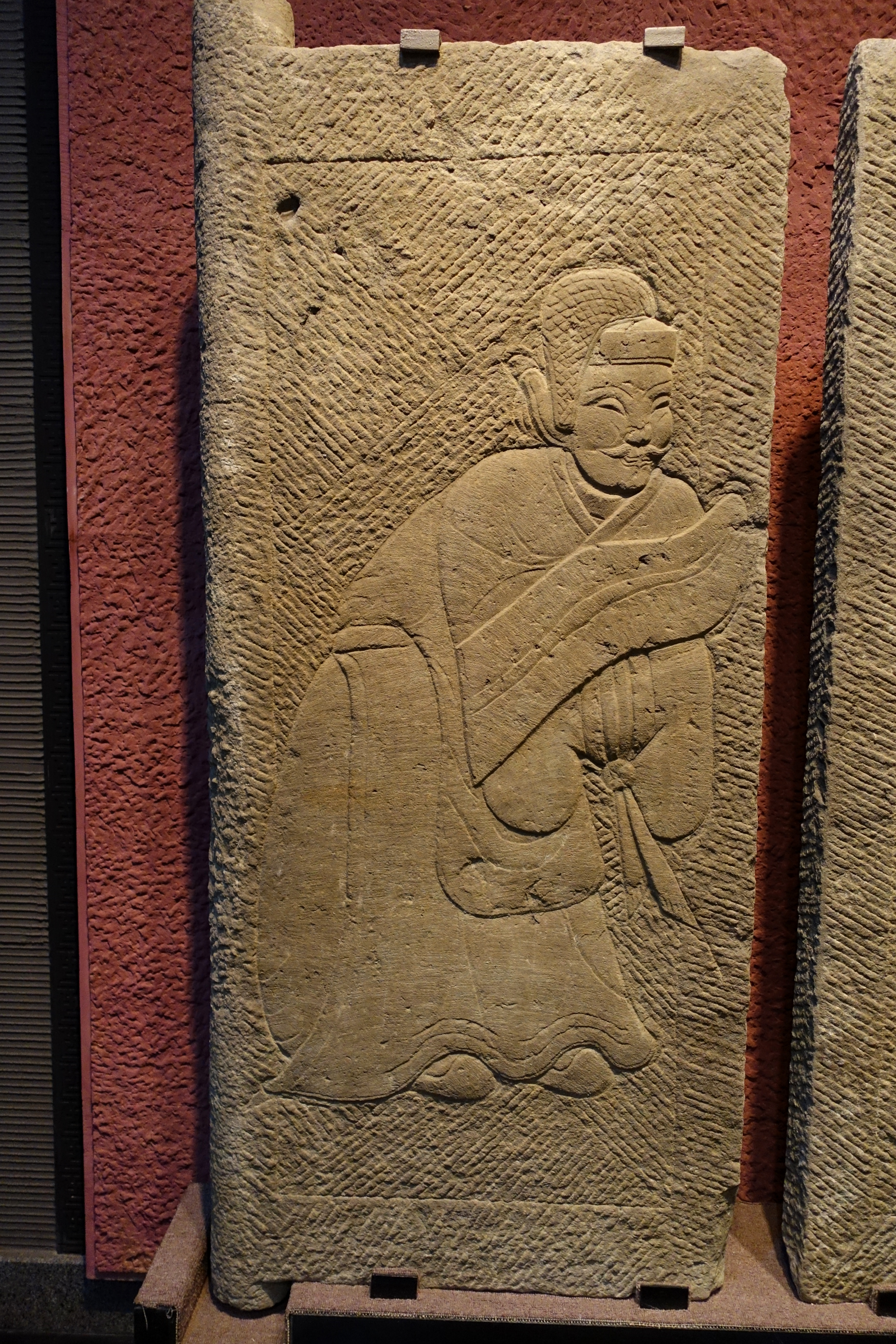
An Eastern Han carved stone tomb door showing a man carrying a shield, wearing a long robe with apron and a wuguan (武冠)/wubian (武弁) on jieze (介帻), stored in Sichuan Provincial Museum in Chengdu.

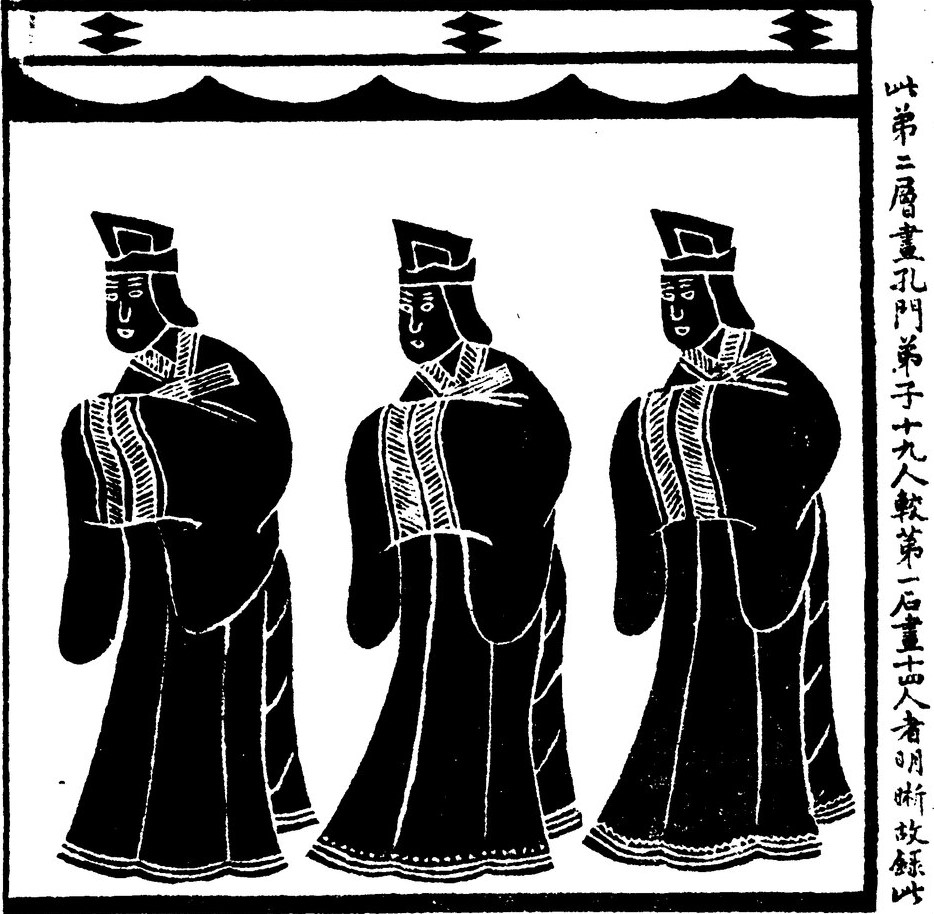
Tracing of stone-relief depicting scholar-officials on Wu Family Shrines.

In the beginning of the Han dynasty, there was no restrictions on the clothing worn by common people. During the Western Han, the imperial edicts on the use of general clothing were not specific enough to be restrictive to the people, and were not enforced to a great degree. The clothing was simply differed accordingly to the seasons: blue or green for spring, red for summer, yellow for autumn and black for winter. It was the Emperor Ming of Han formalized the dress code of Han dynasty in 59 AD, during the Eastern Han, restoring the ceremonial use of mianfu system from the prior junxuan of the Qin dynasty. According to the new dress code, the emperor had to be dressed in a black-coloured upper garment and in an ocher yellow-coloured lower garment. The Shangshu – Yiji 《尚书益稷》records the 12 ornaments used on the sacrificial garments which were used to differentiate social ranks in the earlier times. In addition, regulations on the ornaments used by emperors, councillors, dukes, princes, ministers and officials were specified. There were distinct styles of clothing based on social ranks, these regulations were accompanied with Confucian rituals. Different kind of headgear, weaving and fabric material, as well as ribbons attached to officials seals, were also used to distinguish the officials. The official seal was then placed in a leather pouch, was put on its wearer's waist and the ribbon, which came in different colours, size, and texture to indicate ranking, would hang outside the pouch.

Throughout the years, Han dynasty women commonly also wore ruqun of various colours. The combination of upper and lower garments in women's wardrobe eventually became the clothing model of the Han ethnicity of the later generations. During the Qin and Han dynasties, women wore skirts which was composed of four pieces cloth sewn together; a belt was often attached to the skirt, but the use of a separate belt was sometimes used by women.

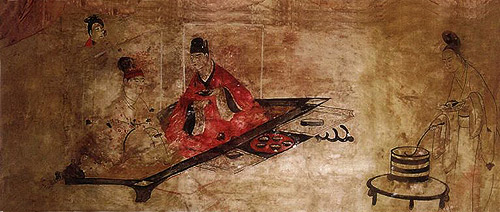
A married couple drinks and dines, Eastern Han tomb.

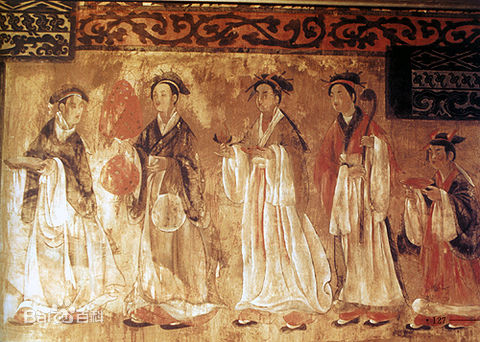
Mural from Dahuting Han Tomb of the late Eastern Han dynasty, in Henan, China

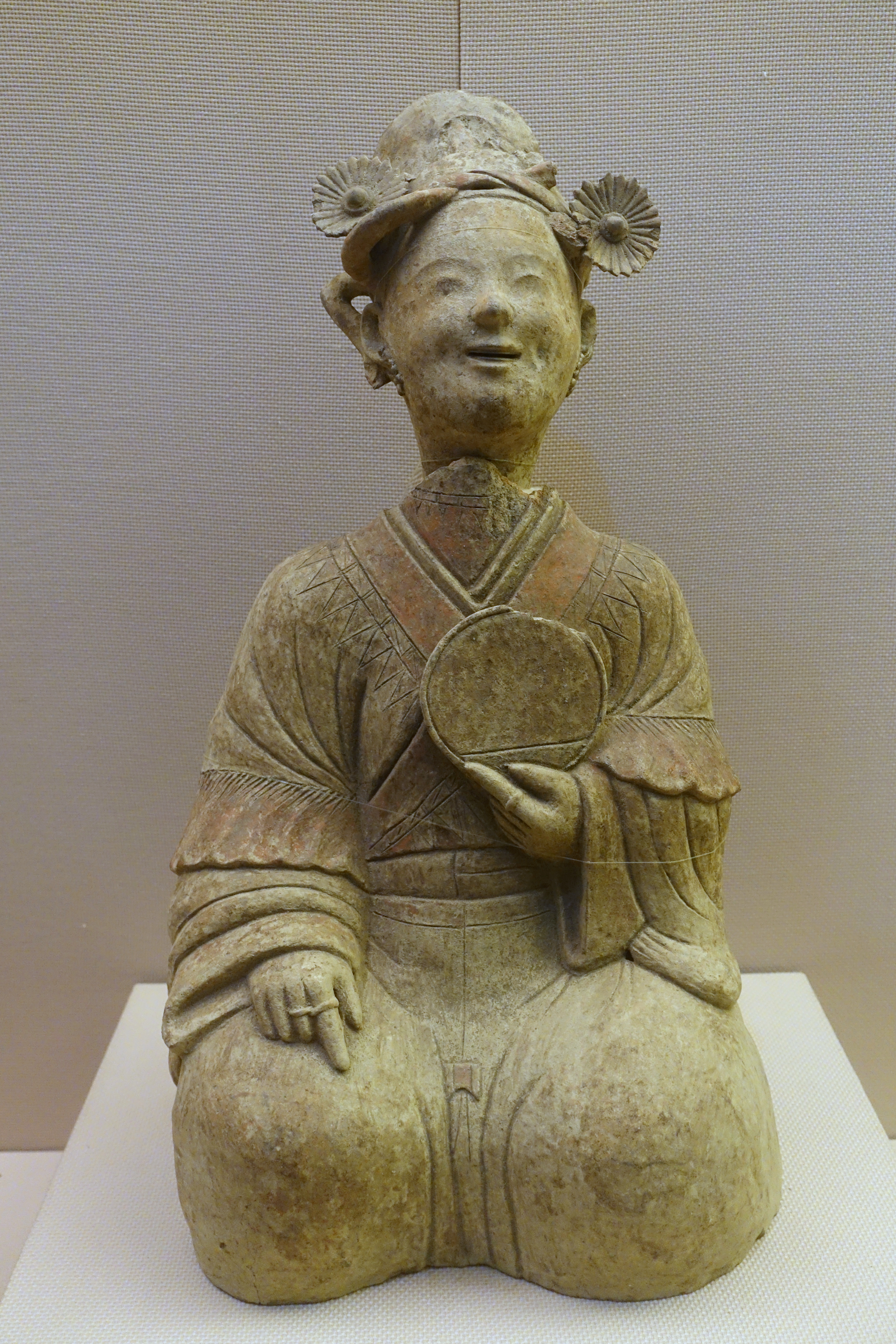
A Chinese ceramic statue of a woman holding a bronze mirror, Eastern Han period (25–220 AD), Sichuan Museum, Chengdu

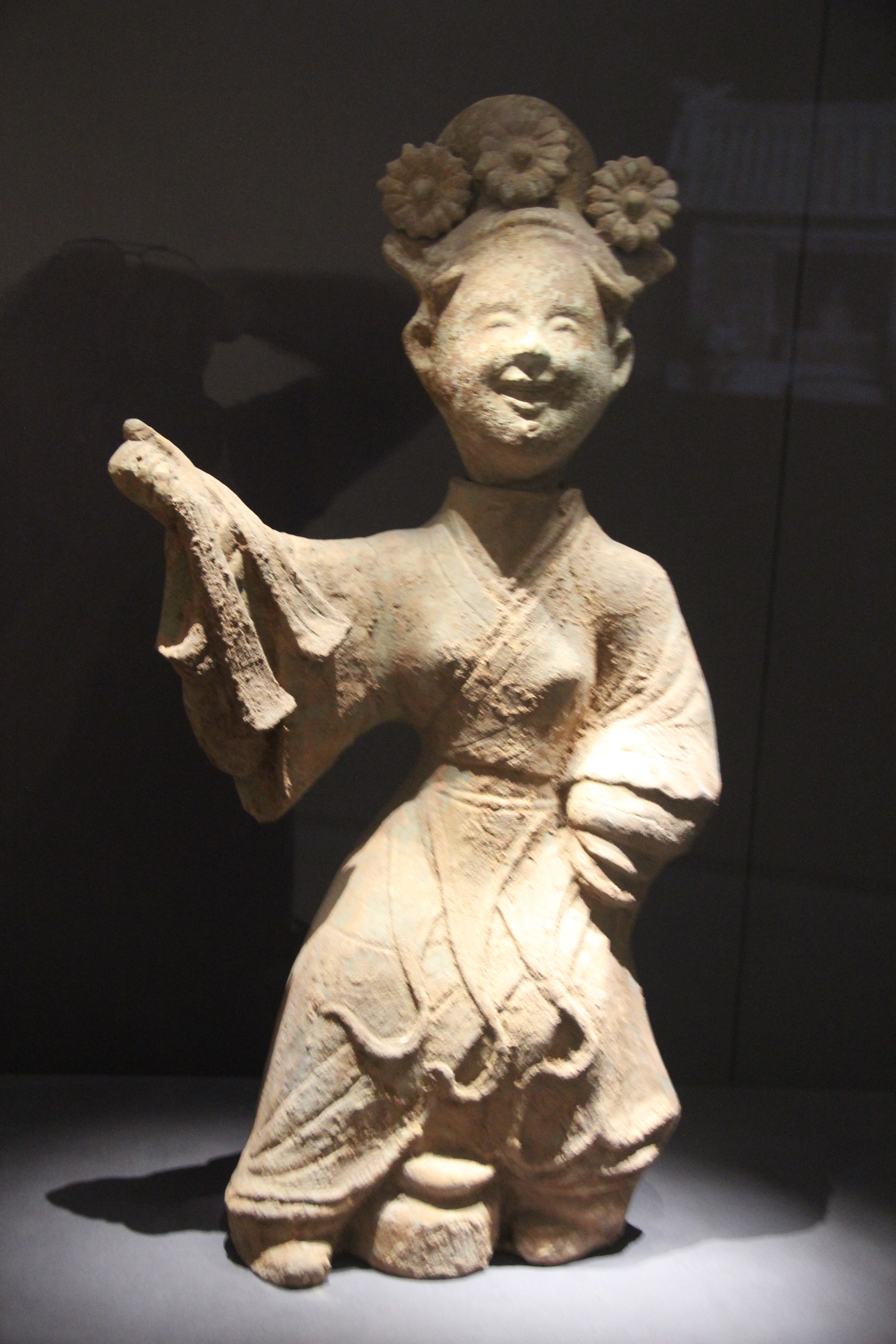
A female dancer from Eastern Han dynasty

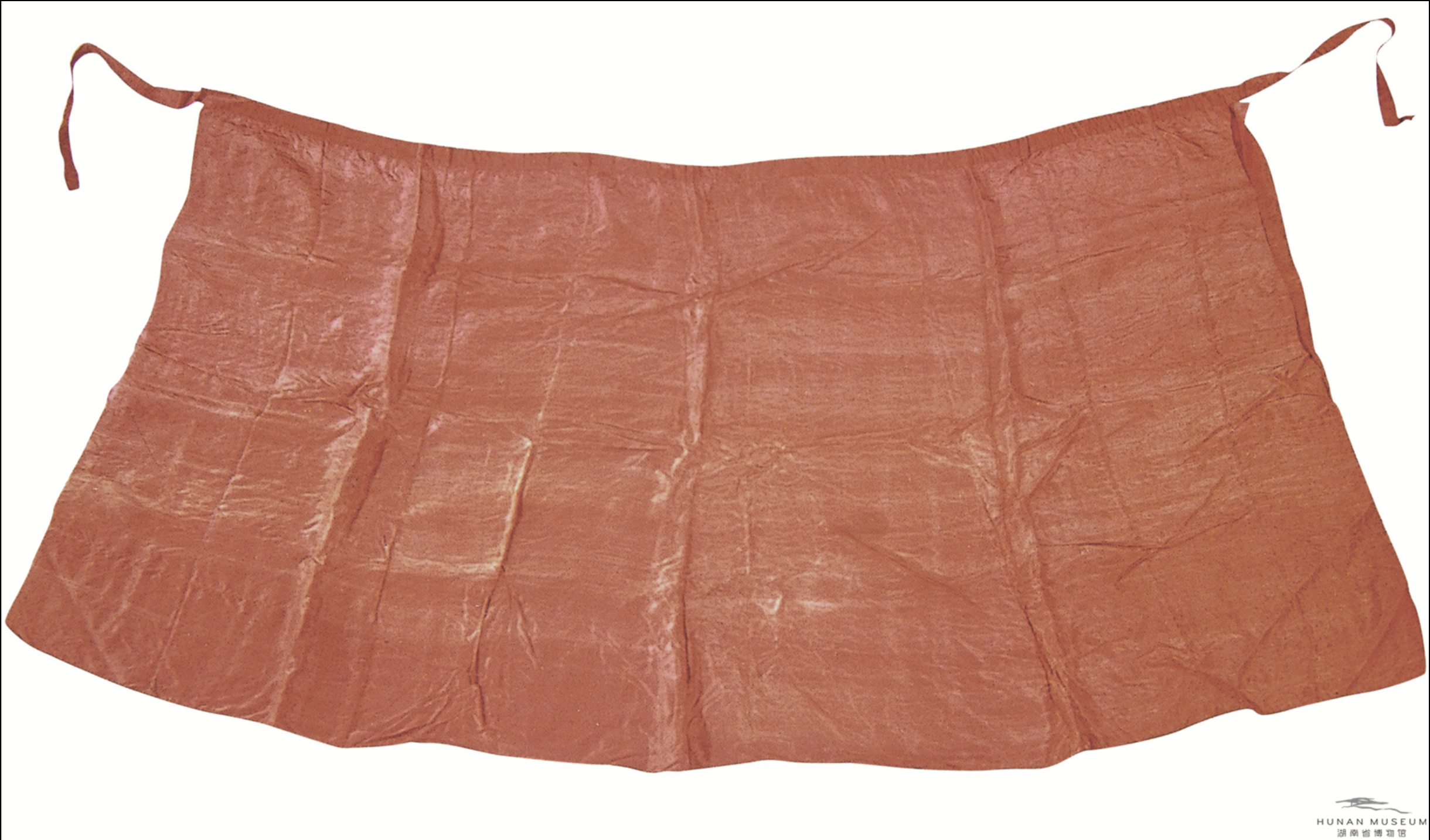
A Western Han skirt made of thin silk, composed of four pieces sewn together. Excavated from the Mawangdui Tomb No.1. Now stored in the Hunan Museum.

The male farmers, workers, businessmen and scholars, were all dressed in similar fashion during the Han dynasty; jackets, aprons, and dubikun or leggings were worn by male labourers. The jackets worn by men who engaged in physical work is described as being a shorter version of zhijupao and it was worn with trousers. The jingyi continued to be worn in the early period of Han dynasty; other forms of trousers in this period were the dakouku and dashao; both were developed from the hedangku loose rise introduced by King Wuling. Men in the Han dynasty also wore a kerchief or a guan on their heads. The guan was used as a symbol of higher status and could only be worn by people of distinguished background. The emperors wore tongtianguan (通天冠) when meeting with their imperial subjects, yuanyouguan (遠遊冠) were worn by dukes and princes; jinxianguan (進賢冠) was worn by civil officials while military officials wore wuguan (武冠). The kerchief was a piece of clothing that wrapped around the head, and it symbolized the status of adulthood in men. One form of kerchief was ze (帻); it was a headband that keep the head warm during cold weather. Over time the ze was attached with a head covering scarf, or jin (巾), and developed into a full cap called jinze (巾帻). The jinze was adopted into widespread use and worn commonly by military personnel and commoners. Military jinze was red in color, also called chize (赤帻). Another variant with a roof-shaped top called jieze(介帻) is used by civil servants, usually greenish black in colour until summer seasons. Men and women also wore a lined, long robe called paofu.

As Buddhism arrived in China during late period of Han dynasty, robes of Buddhist monks started to be produced. The attire worn in the Han dynasty laid the foundation for the clothing development in the succeeding dynasties.

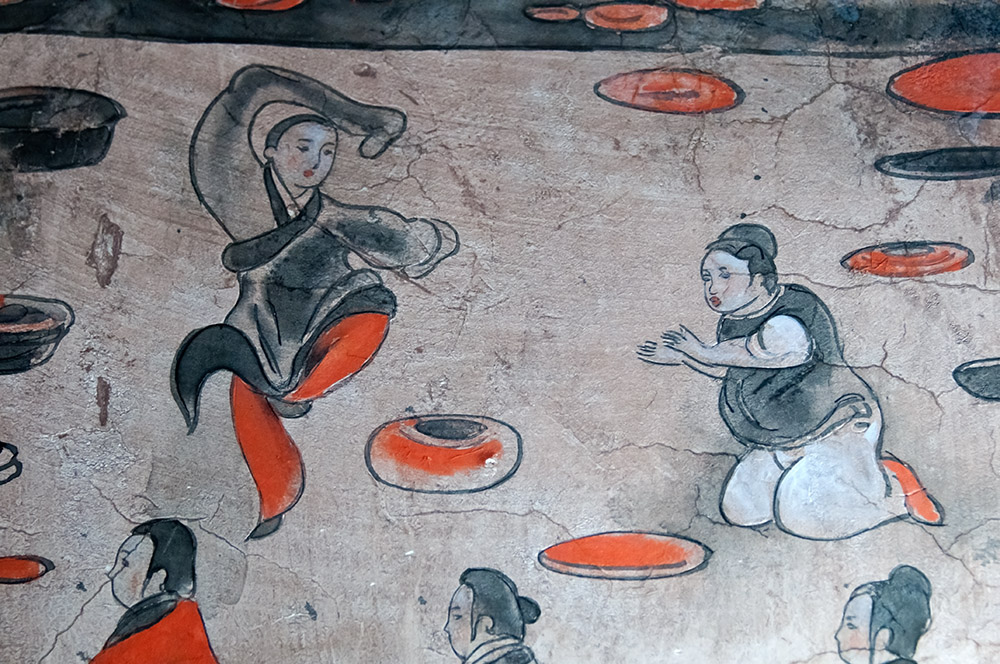
A male dancer wearing a black jiaolingpao over a pair of red trousers, Dahuting tomb, Eastern Han dynasty

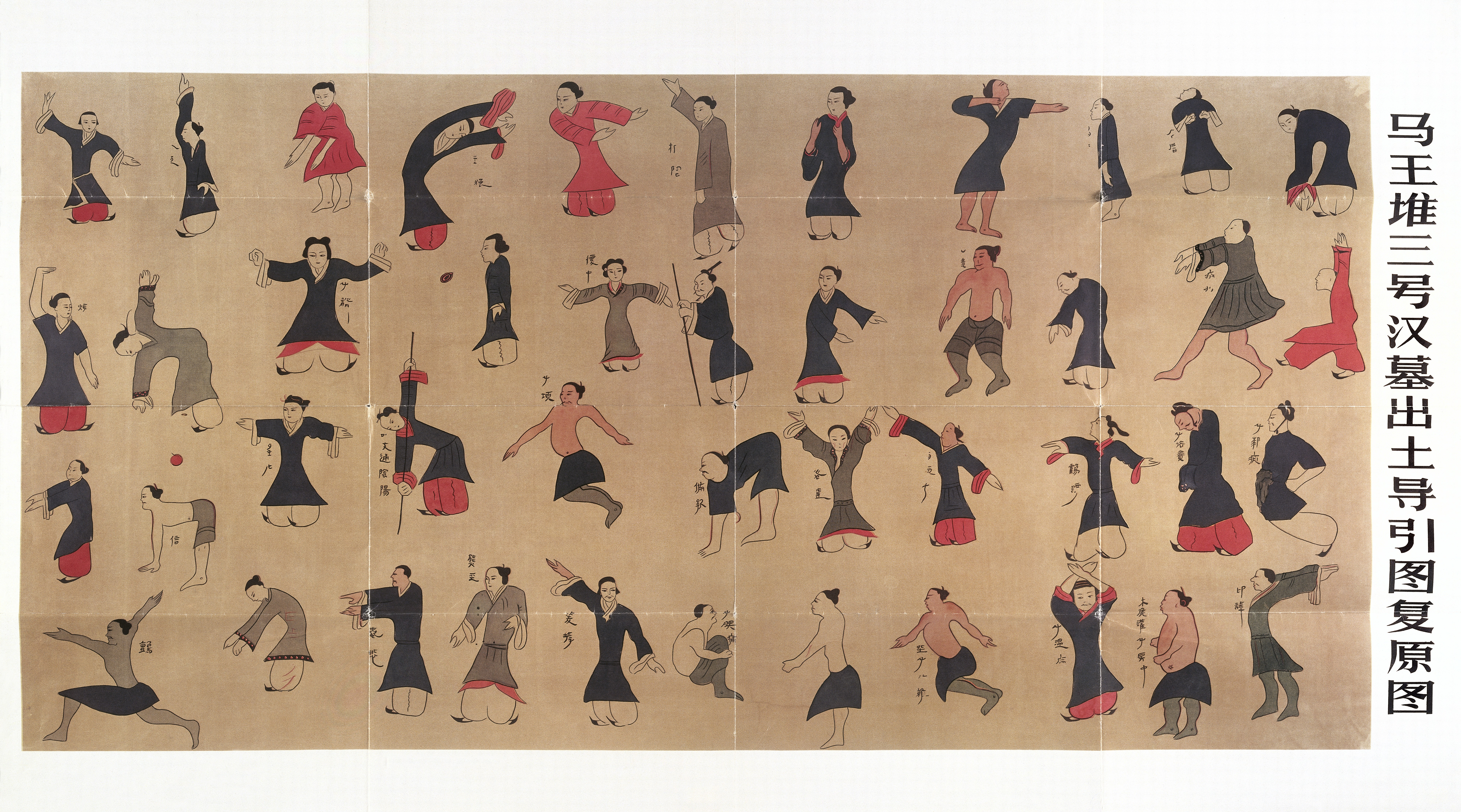
A reconstruction of the Daoyin tu (an exercise chart showing "Guiding and Pulling Chart"), excavated from the Mawangdui Tomb 3 (sealed in 168BC) in the former kingdom of Changsha

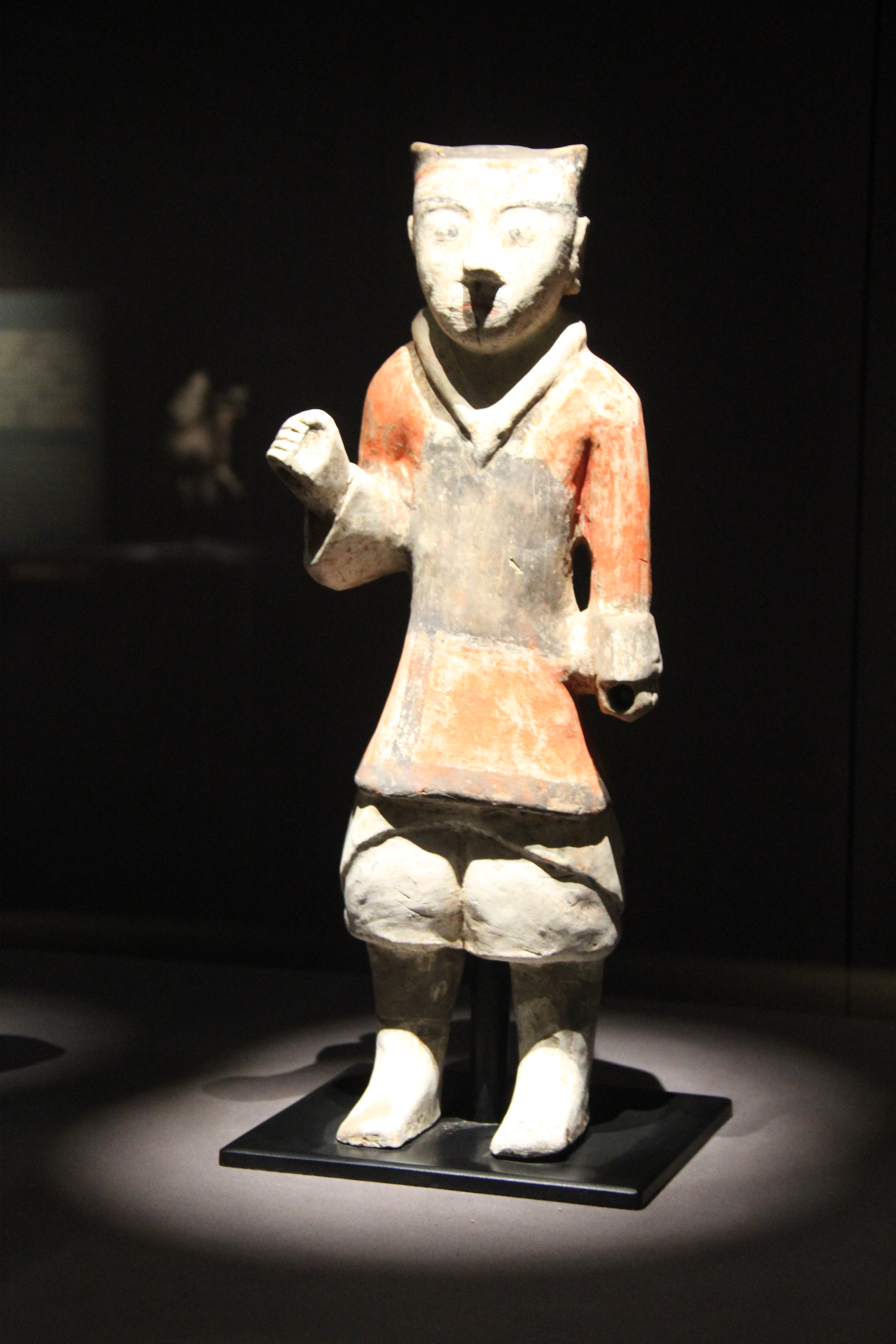
A Western Han warrior figure.

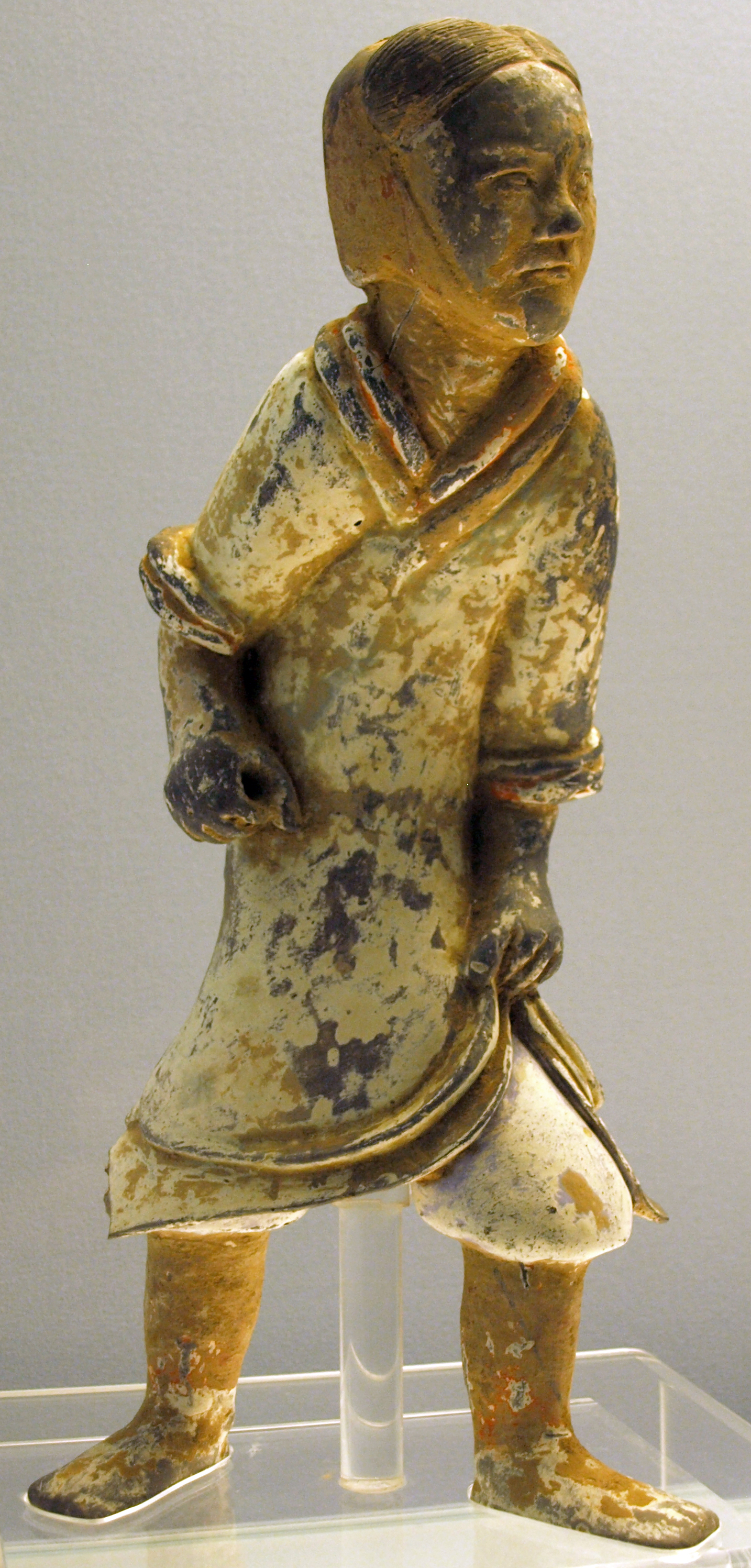
An Eastern Han male figure wearing a wubian (武弁), Shanghai Museum

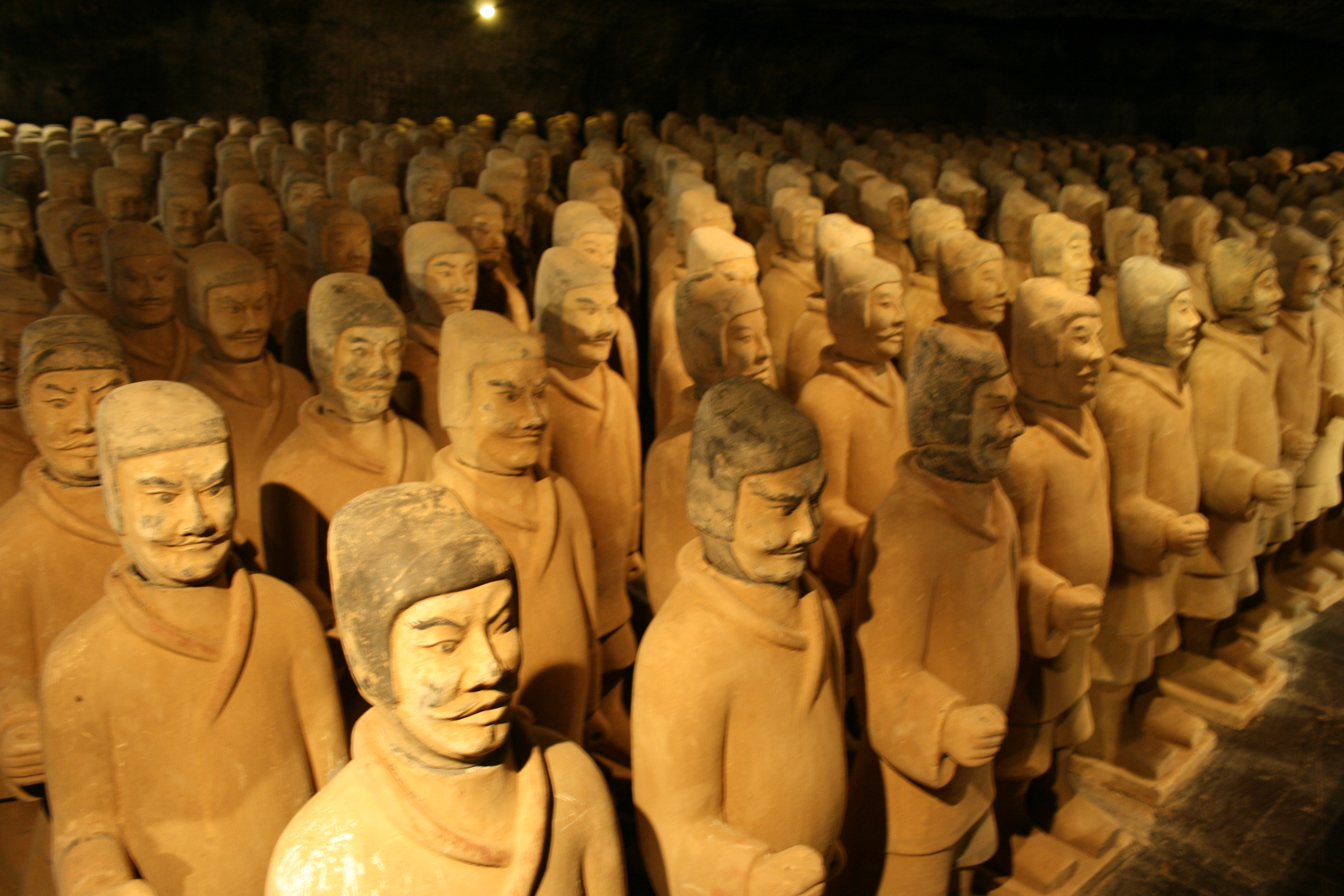
Funerary terracotta soldiers wearing wubian.

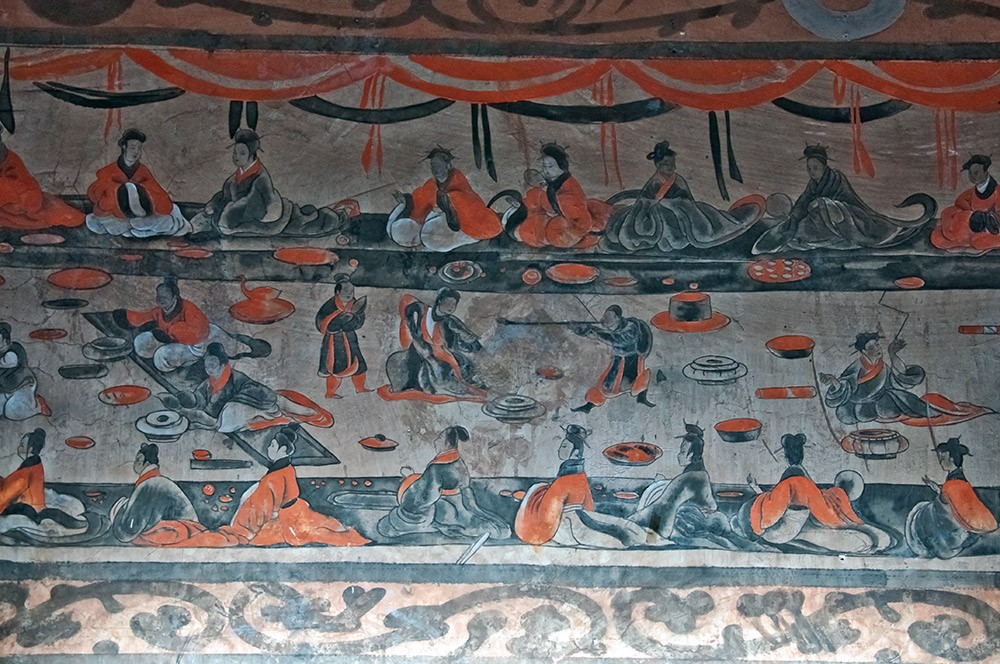
A late Eastern Han Chinese tomb mural showing lively scenes of a banquet, dance and music, acrobatics, and wrestling, from the Dahuting Han Tomb in Henan, China

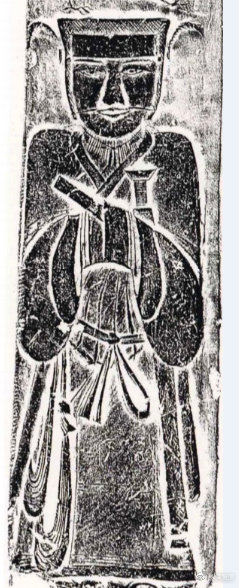
Military official depicted on Han dynasty stone relief found in Deng county, Henan. Wuguan hat with pheasant-tail decorations denominates martial status.

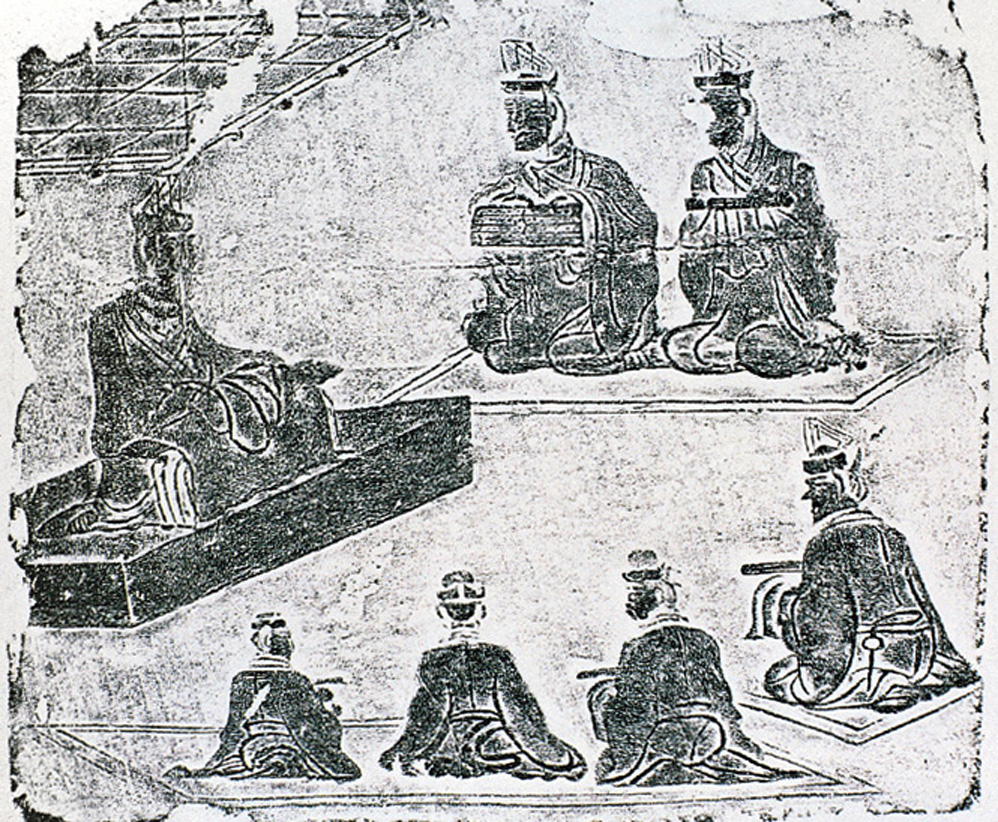
Scholars depicted on Han dynasty pictorial brick, discovered in Chengdu. Scholars wore hats called Jinxian Guan (进贤冠) to denominate educational status.

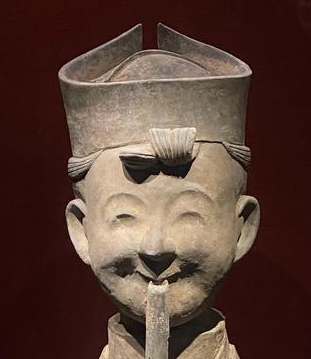
jieze (介帻), as worn by a ceramic xiao-flute player.

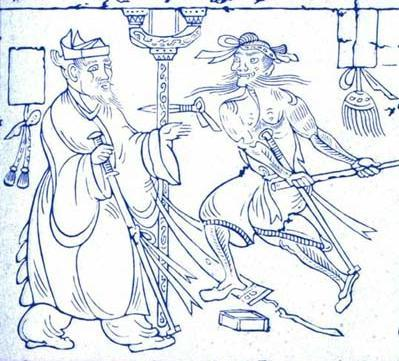
Jieze worn by man (left)

Ornaments and jewelry, such as rings, earrings, bracelets, necklace, and hairpins, and hair sticks were common worn in China by the time of Han dynasty. The original hair sticks ji evolved to zanzi with more decorations. And a new type of women hair ornament invented during Han dynasty was the buyao, which was zanzi added with dangling decorations that would sway when the wearer walk and was unique to the Han Chinese women.

=== Three Kingdoms, Jin dynasty ===
The paofu worn in the Han dynasty continued to evolve. During this period, 220–589 AD, the robe became loose on the wearer's body so a wide band functioned as belt was in use to organise the fitting, and the sleeves of the robe changed to "wide-open" instead of cinched at the wrist; this style is referred as bao yi bo dai, and usually worn with inner shirt and trousers. In some instances, the upper part of the robe was loose and open with no inner garment worn; men wearing this style of robe was featured in the painting Seven Sages of the Bamboo Grove. The bao yi bo dai style appears to have been a northern Han Chinese style, and the popularity of the robe was a result of the widespread Taoism. In the Jin dynasty, in particular, while many clothing of the Han dynasty were maintained, scholars and adherents of Neo-Taoism rejected the traditional court dress and retreated from the rigid Confucian system; this showed up in how they would dress themselves. The style of men's paofu gradually changed into a more simple and casual style, while the style of women's paofu increased in complexity. During the Three Kingdoms and Jin period, especially during the Eastern Jin period (317 – 420 AD), aristocratic women sought for a carefree life style after the collapse of the Eastern Han dynasty's ethical code; this kind of lifestyle influenced the development of women's clothing, which became more elaborate. Typical women attire during this period is the guiyi, a wide-sleeved paofu adorned with xian (髾; long swirling silk ribbons) and shao (襳; a type of triangular pieces of decorative embroidered-cloth) on the lower hem of the robe that hanged like banners and formed a "layered effect". The robe continued to be worn in the Northern and Southern dynasties by both men and women, as seen in the lacquered screen found in the Northern Wei tomb of Sima Jinlong (ca. 483 A.D); however, there were some minor alterations to the robe, such as higher waistline and the sleeves are usually left open in a dramatic flare.

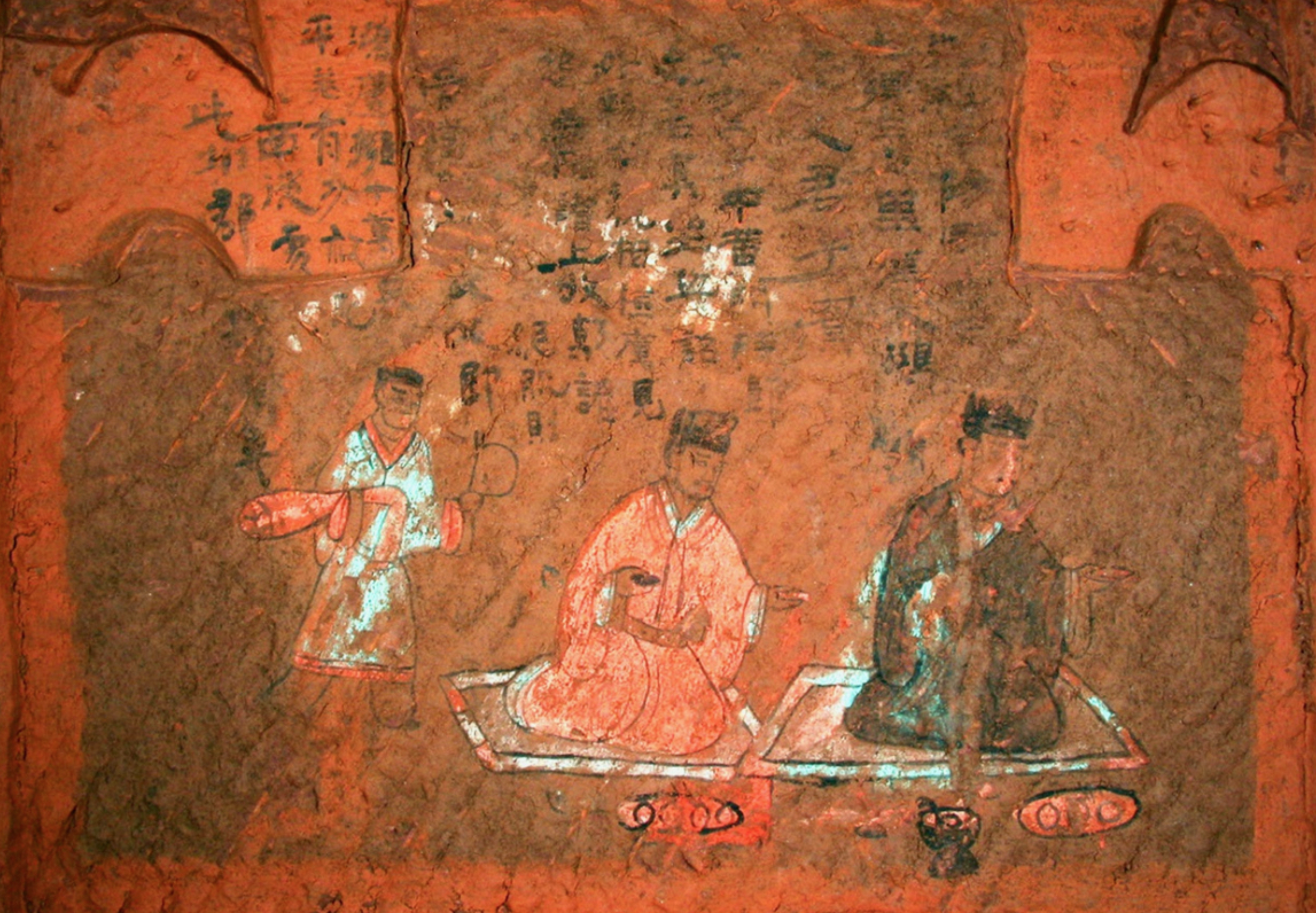
Mural of a feast with two officials wearing paofu and jinxianguan, from Taliangzi Cliff Tomb No. 3, Sichuan.

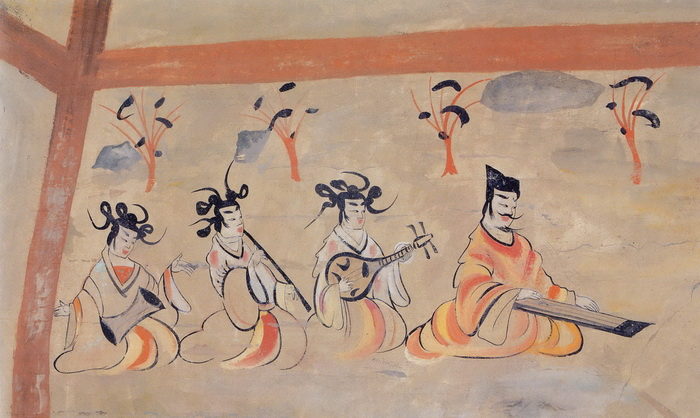
A mural painting showing man and women wearing loose robes, from the Northern Liang's Dingjiazha Tomb No. 5 of the Sixteen Kingdoms period

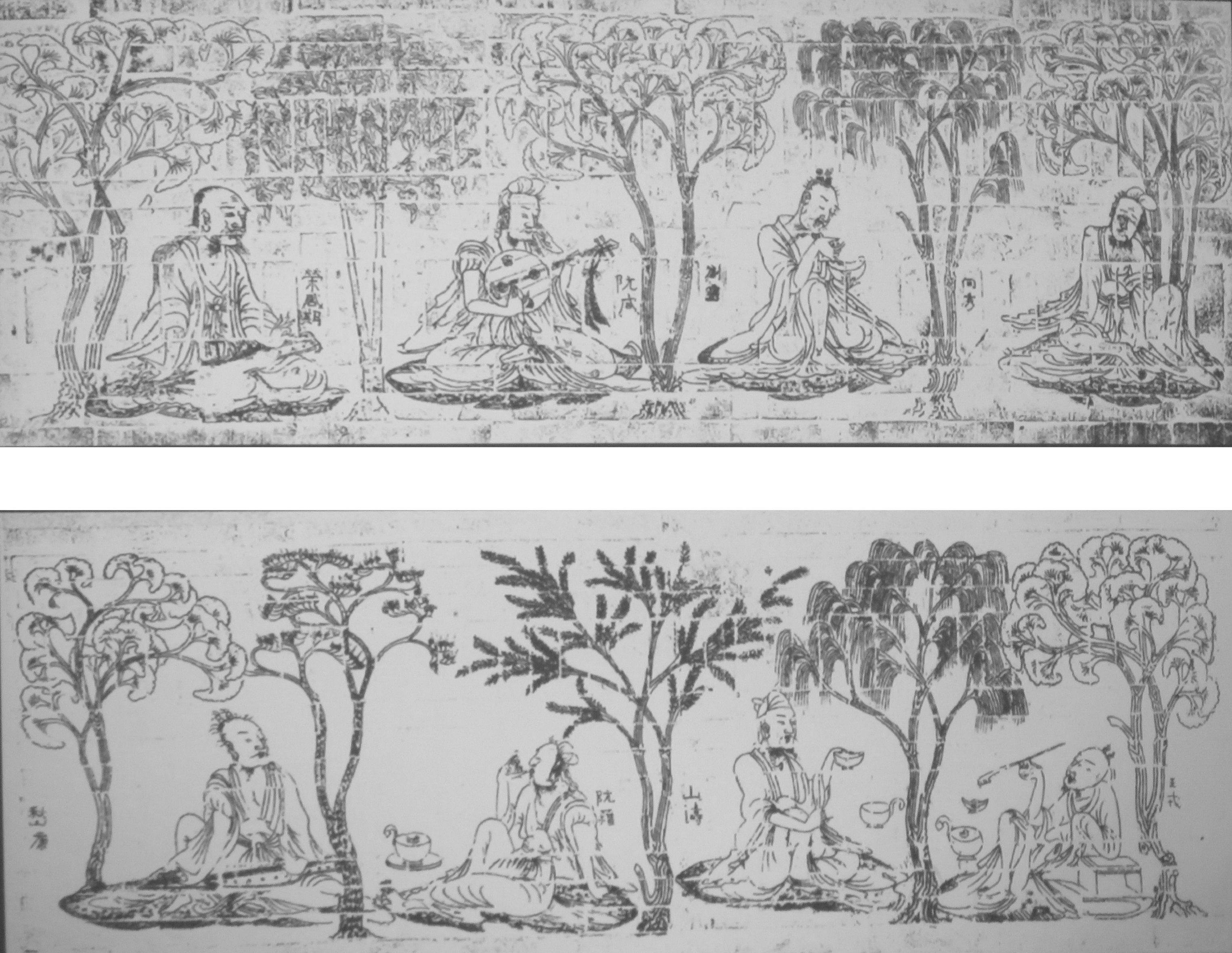
Seven Sages of the Bamboo Grove wearing bao yi bo dai, from rubbing of Eastern Jin molded tomb bricks

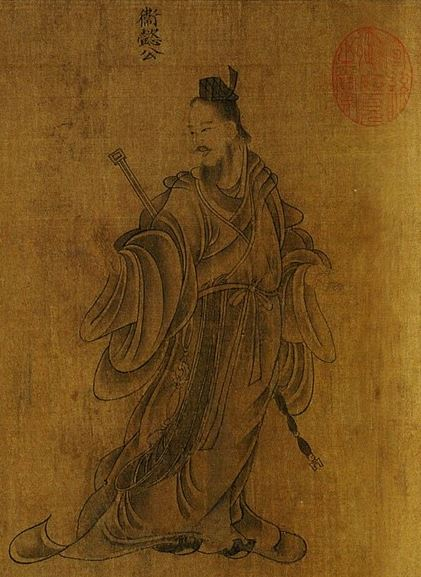
Duke Yi of Wey (衞懿公) wearing paofu, from Wise and Benevolent Women (列女仁智圖) by Jin dynasty's Gu Kaizhi

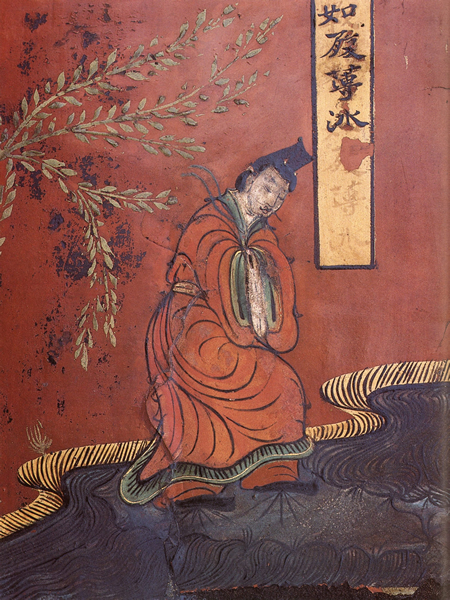
A man wearing paofu.

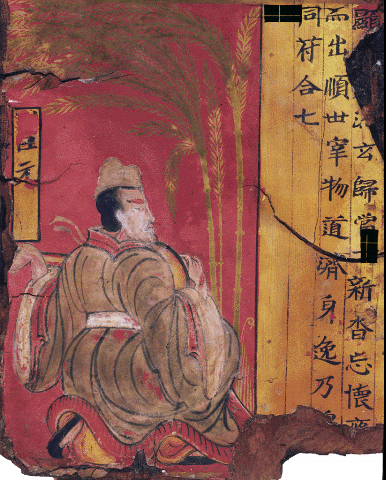
Back view of a man wearing paofu with trousers under his robe

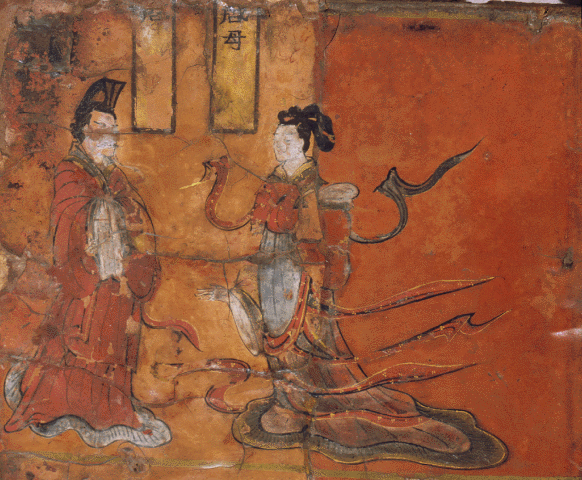
A man wearing paofu and a woman wearing guiyi; lacquer painting, Tomb of Sima Jinlong, Northern Wei, c.484 AD

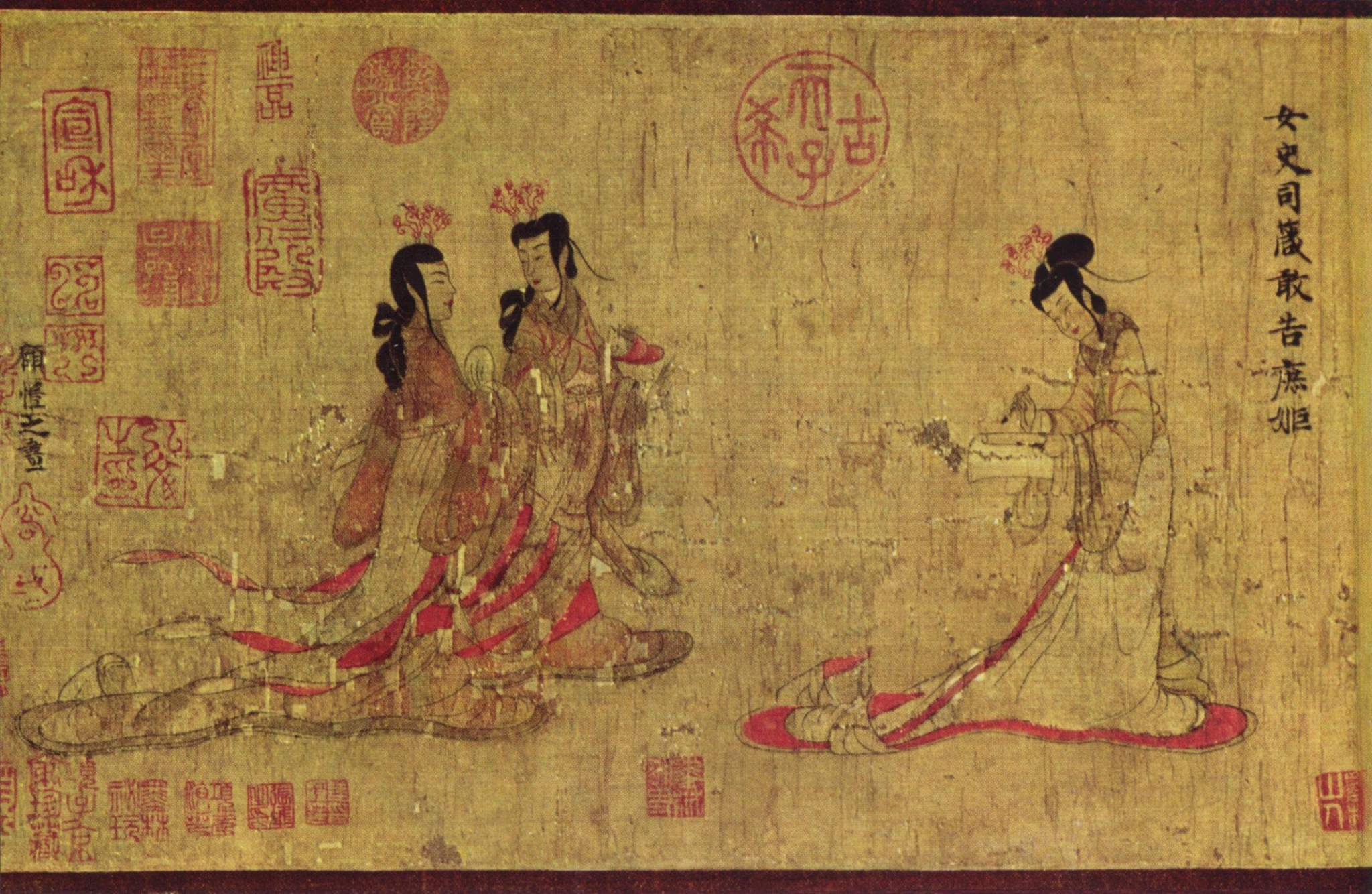
Court ladies wearing ruqun and guiyi, from Admonitions of the Instructress to the Palace Ladies (女史箴图) by Gu Kaizhi, c.380

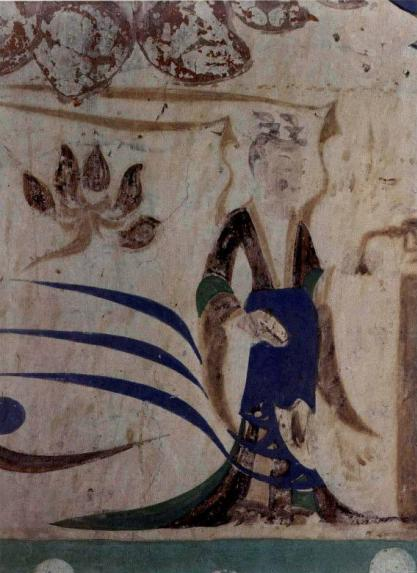
Dunhuang Fresco of a Woman dressing in guiyi

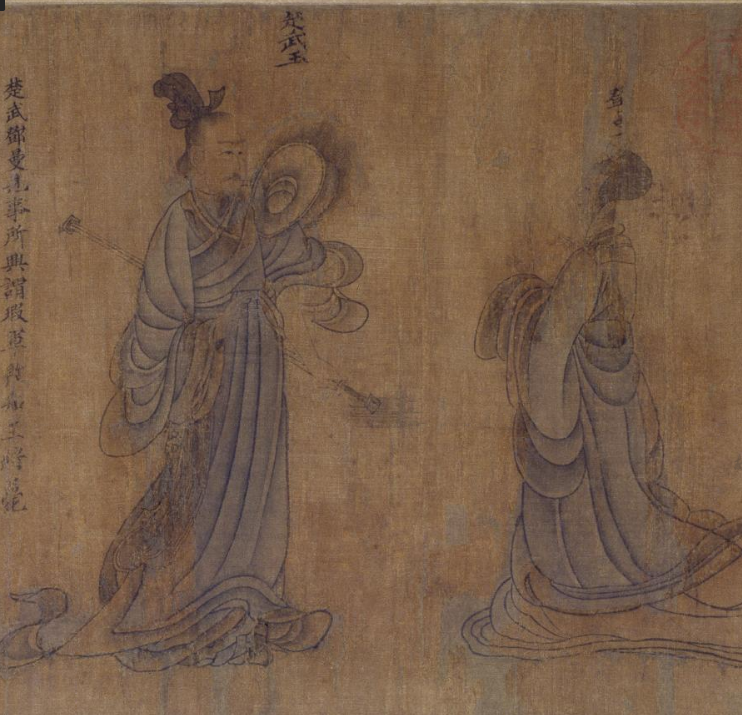
King Wu of Chu wearing paofu and tongtianguan, from Wise and Benevolent Women (列女仁智圖) by Jin dynasty's Gu Kaizhi

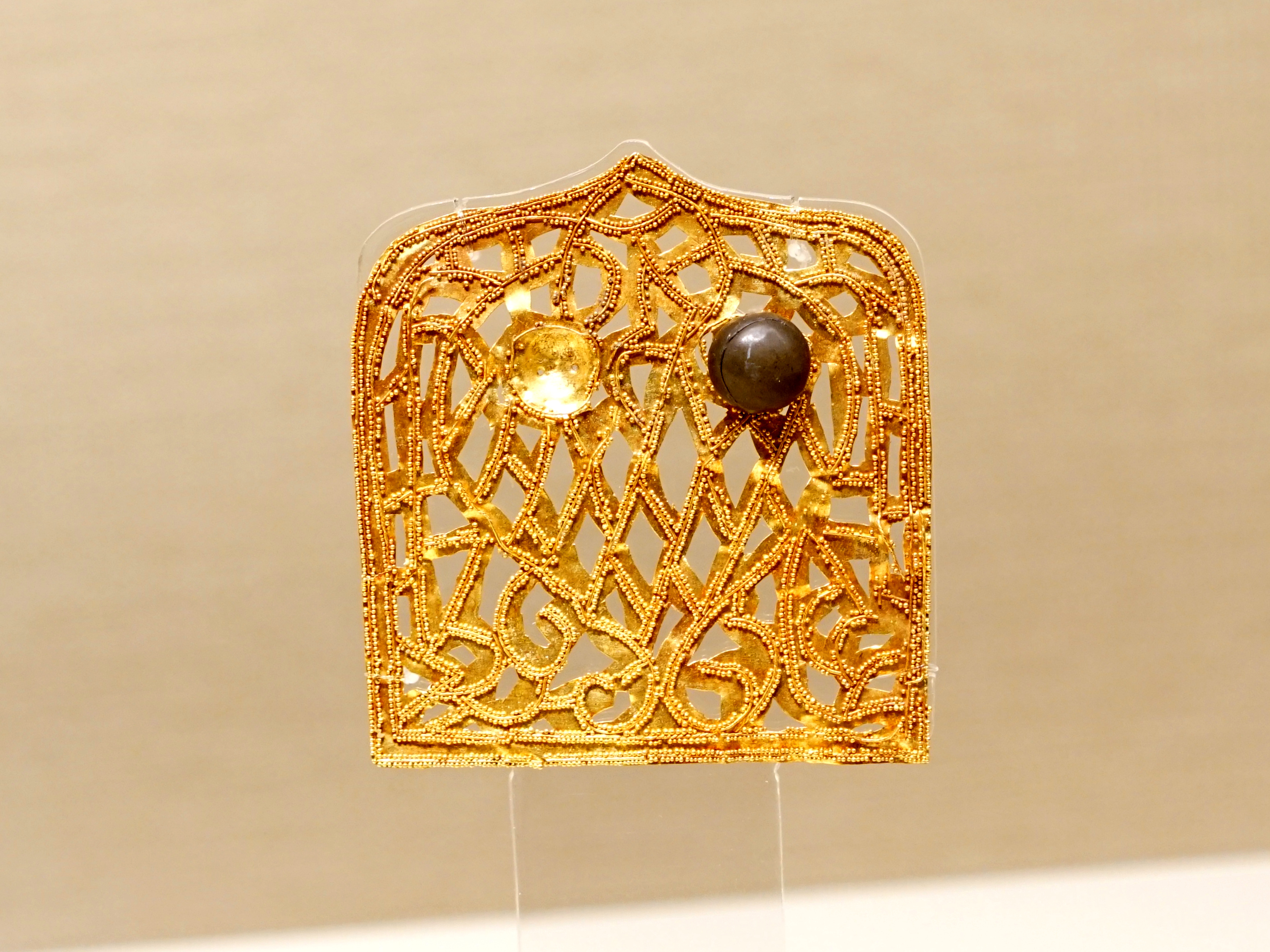
Golden cicada-patterned dāng (珰), used to decorate official headwears such as longguan / wuguan and tongtianguan.

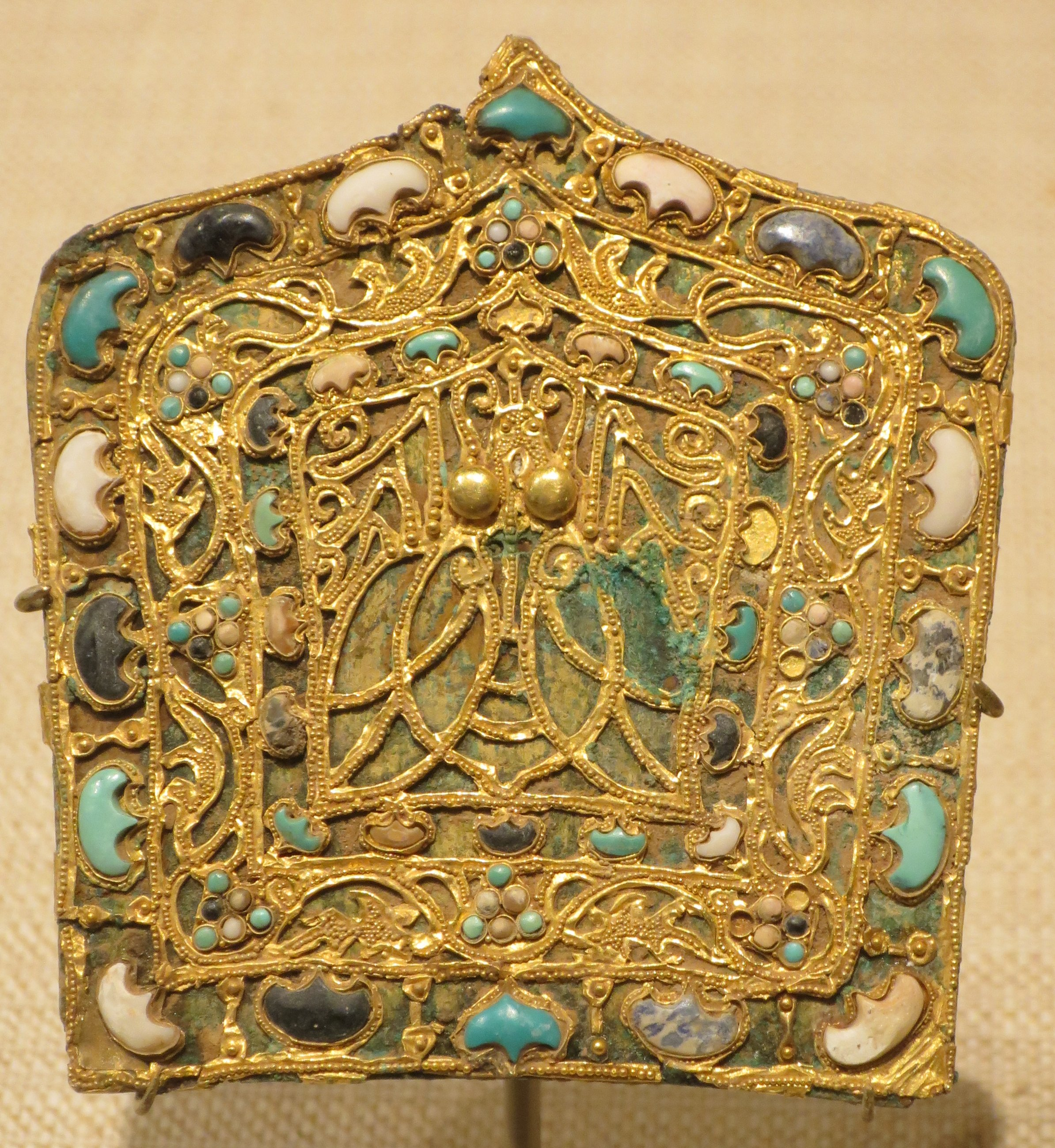
Eastern Jin dynasty cicada-patterned dāng (珰) plaque ornament, with embedded gemstones.

Shoes worn during this period included lü (履; regular shoes for formal occasions), ji (屐; high, wooden clogs for informal wear), and shoes with tips which would curl upward. The shoes with tips curled upward would later become a very popular fashion in the Tang dynasty. Leather boots (靴, xue), quekua (缺胯; an open-collared robe with tight sleeves; it cannot cover the undershirt), hood and cape ensemble were introduced by northern nomads in China. Tomb inventories found during this period include: fangyi (方衣; square garment), shan (衫; shirt), qun, hanshan (汗衫; sweatshirt), ru (襦; lined jacket), ku (裤), kun (裈), liangdang (两裆; vest), ao (袄; multi-layered lined jacket), xi (褶; a type of jacket), bixi; while women's clothing style were usually ruqun (lined jacket with long skirt) and shanqun (衫裙; shirt with long skirt), men's clothing styles are robes, shanku, and xiku (褶裤; jacket with trousers). During this period, the black gauze hats with a flat top and an ear at either side appeared and were popular for both men and women.

Although they had their own cultural identity, the Cao Wei (220–266 AD) and the Western Jin (266–316 AD) dynasties continued the cultural legacy of the Han dynasty. Clothing during the Three Kingdoms era and the clothing in Jin dynasty (266–420 AD) roughly had the same basic forms as the Han dynasty with special characteristics in their styles; the main clothing worn during those times are: ruqun (jacket and skirt), ku, and qiu (裘; a fur coat). During this period, elites generally wore paofu while peasants wore shanku consisting of short jackets and ku. Male commoners wore similar dress as Han dynasty male commoner did; archeological artefacts of this period depict male commoners wearing a full-sleeved, knee-length youren jacket; man's hairstyle is usually a topknot or a flat cap used for head covering. Female commoners dressed in similar fashion as their male counterpart but their jacket was sometimes depicted longer; they also wore long skirt or trousers. Attendants (not to be confused with servants) on the other hand are depicted wearing two layers of garment and wore a long skirt reaching the ground with long flowing sleeved jacket. The jacket is sometimes closed with a belt or a fastener. White colour was the colour worn by commoner people during the Three Kingdoms and Jin period. Commoner-style clothing from this period can be seen on the Jiayuguan bricks painting.

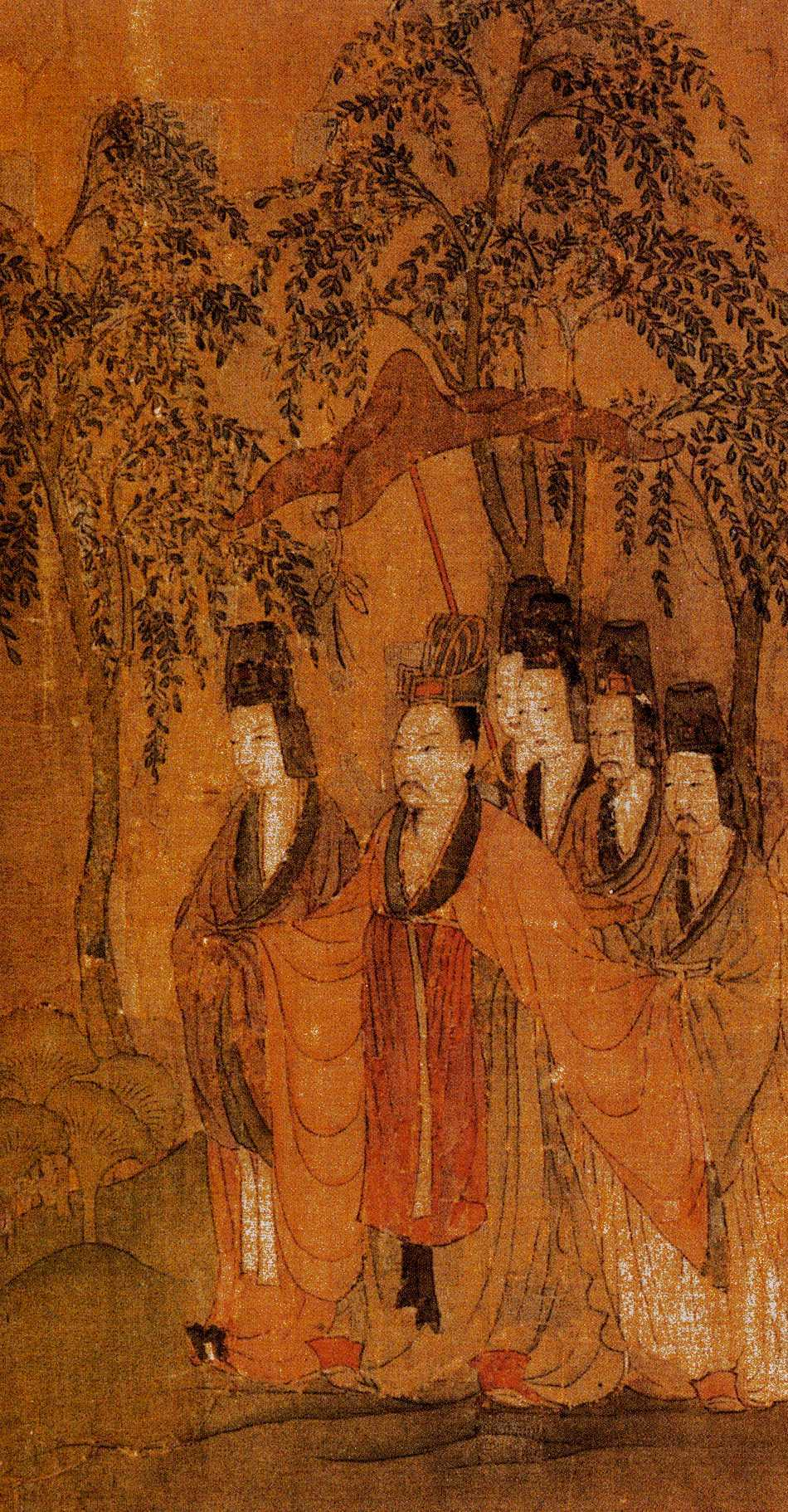
Cao Zhi and attendants wearing a liangguan and longguan respectively, depicted on "Nymph of Luo River" by Gu Kaizhi of Eastern Jin dynasty.

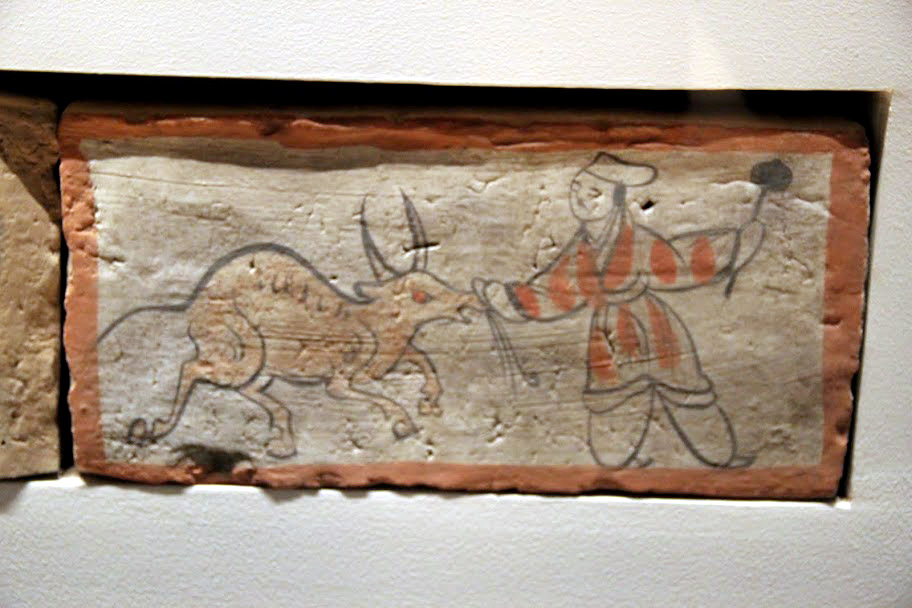
Brick painting of a peasant wearing a full-sleeved youren jacket that reached to knees, Three Kingdoms to Jin, found in Jiayuguan, Gansu.

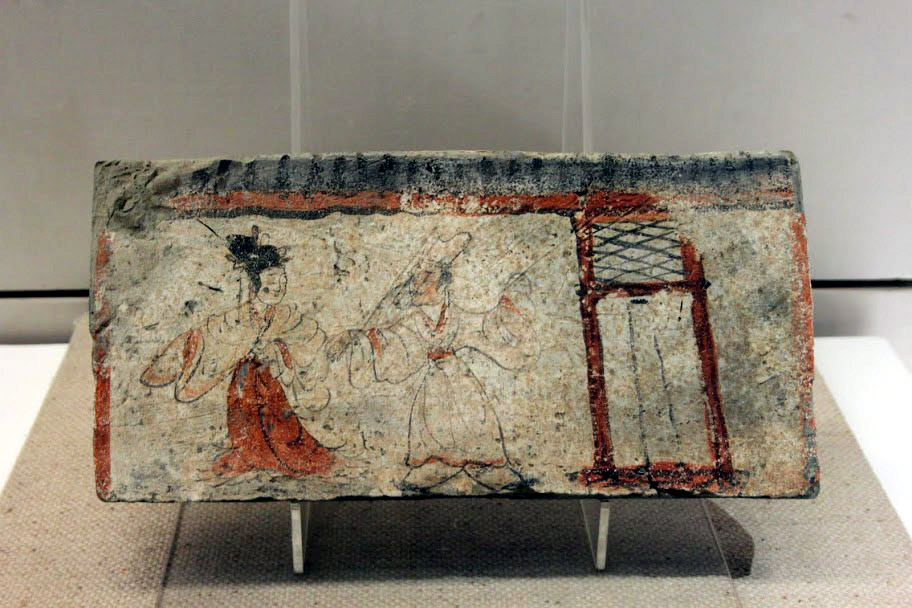
Brick painting of a woman wearing ruqun and a man wearing long robe, Three Kingdoms period.

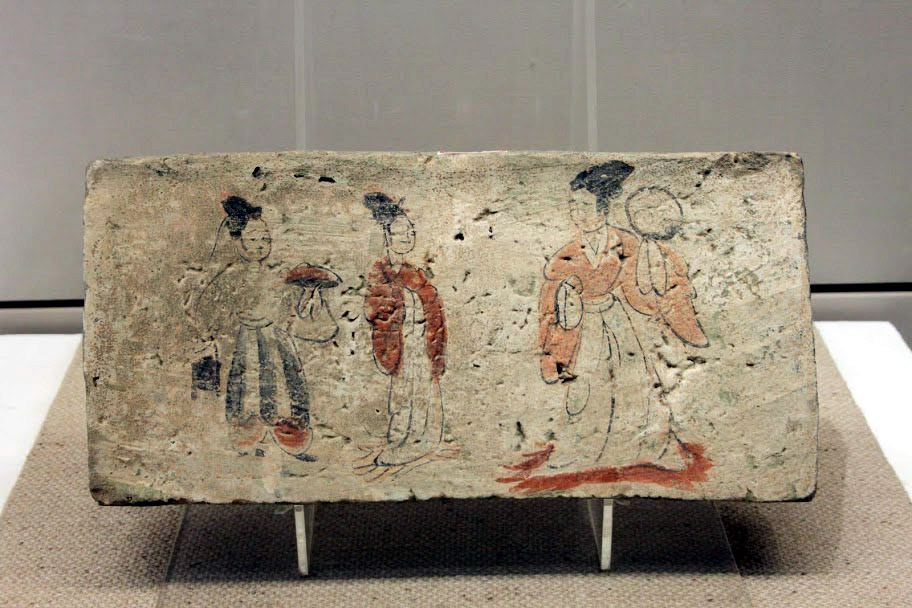
Brick painting of two women wearing ruqun and a female attendant wearing a jacket with skirt, Three Kingdoms period.

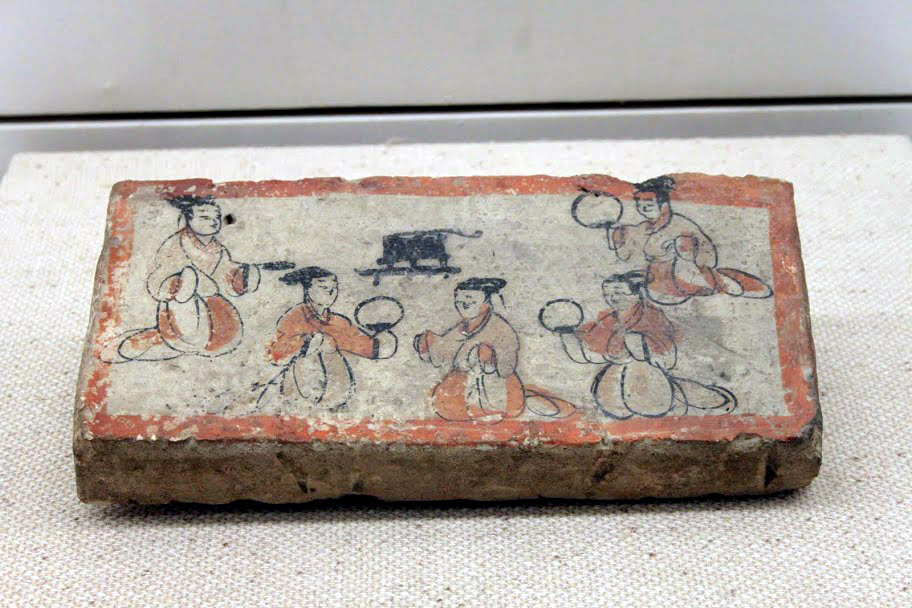
Brick painting of group of women wearing jacket and skirt, Three Kingdoms period.

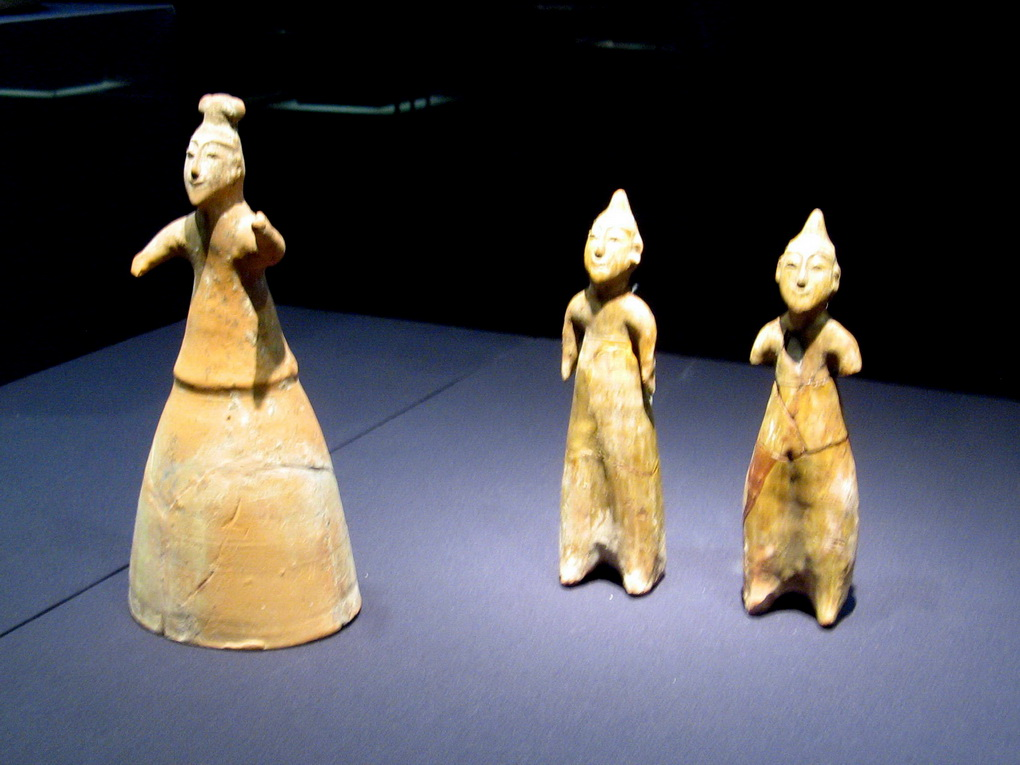
Figure wearing a shanqun, and two male figures with upper garment and trousers, Cao Wei, Three Kingdoms period.

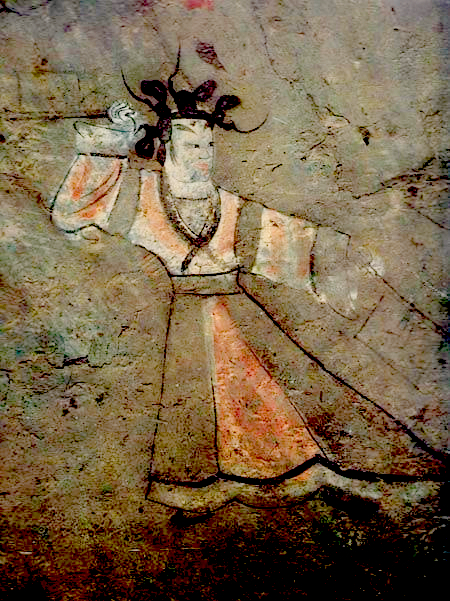
A dancer wearing ruqun from Dingjiazha Tomb No. 5, Gansu, China.

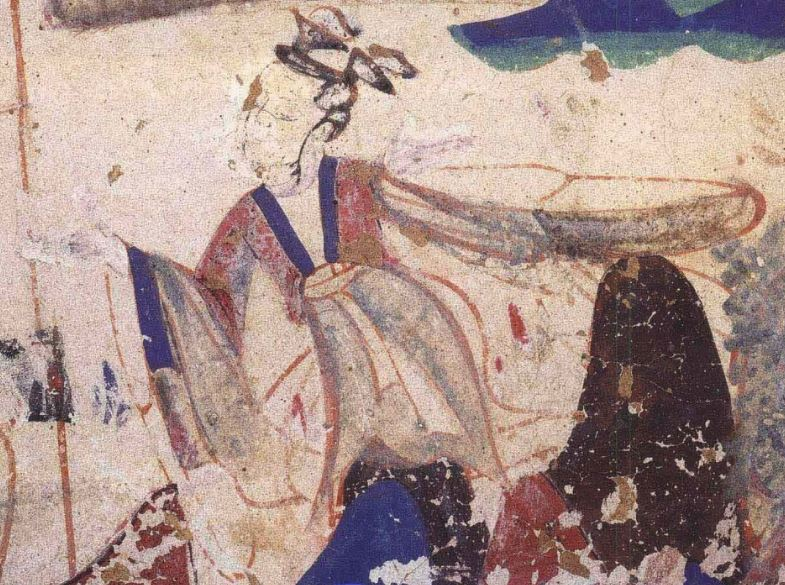
Fresco of a Young Girl, Western Wei.

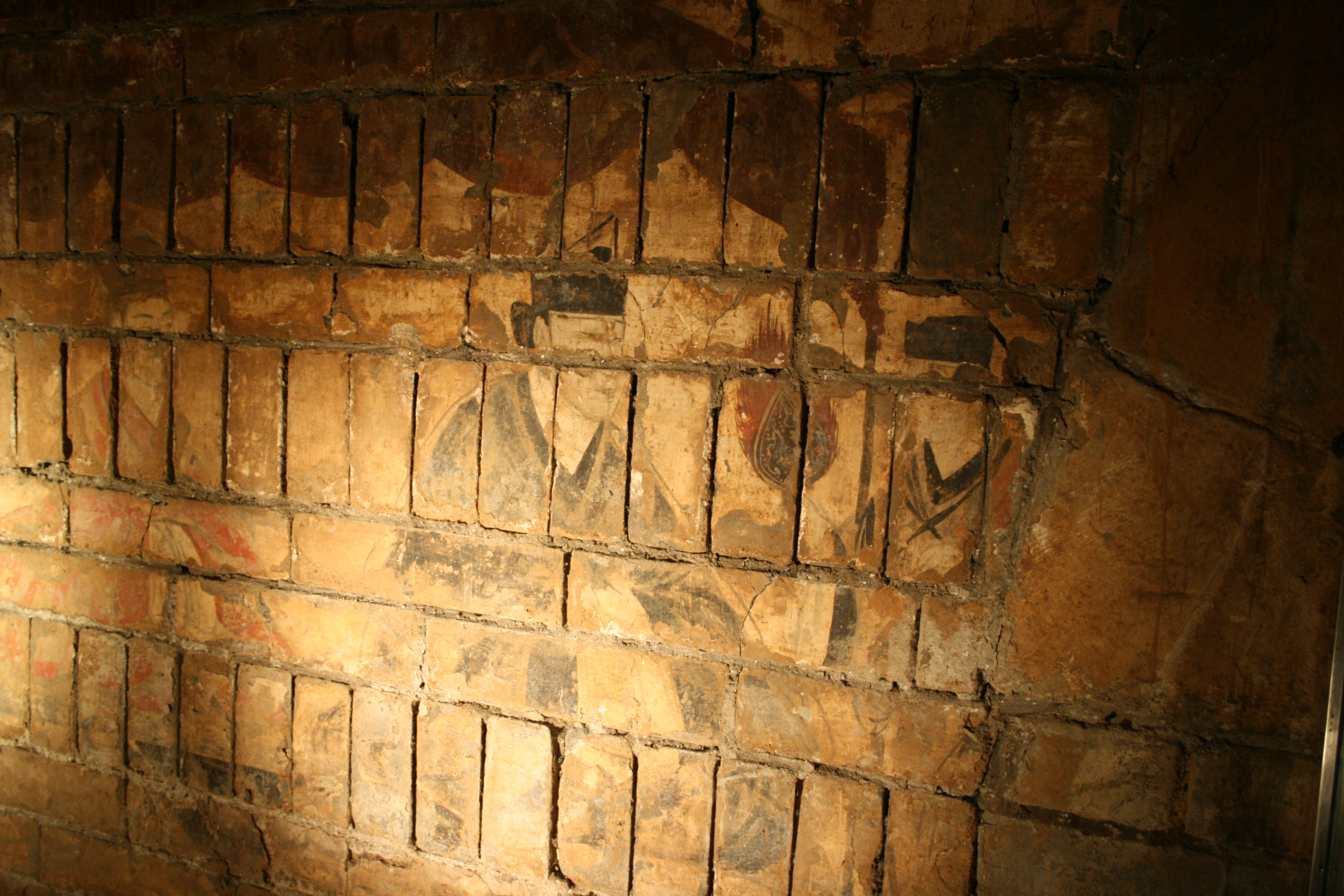
Mural painting of men wearing robes, Cao Wei, Three Kingdoms period.

The dakouku remained popular. Dakouku that were bounded with strings at the knees were also called fuku, During the Western Jin, it was popular to use a felt cord to bind dakouku. It was worn with a knee-length tight cotton-padded robe as a set of attire called kuzhe. The kuzhe was a very popular style of clothing during the Northern and Southern dynasties and was a Hanfu created by assimilating non-Han Chinese cultures. New forms of belts with buckles, dubbed as "Jin style", were also designed during the Western Jin. The "Jin style" belts were later exported to several foreign ethnicities (including the Murong Xianbei, the Kingdom of Buyeo, the early Türks and the Eurasian Avars); these belts was later imitated by the Murong Xianbei and Buyeo before evolving into the golden parade belts with hanging metal straps of Goguryeo and Silla.

=== Sixteen Kingdoms, Northern and Southern dynasties ===
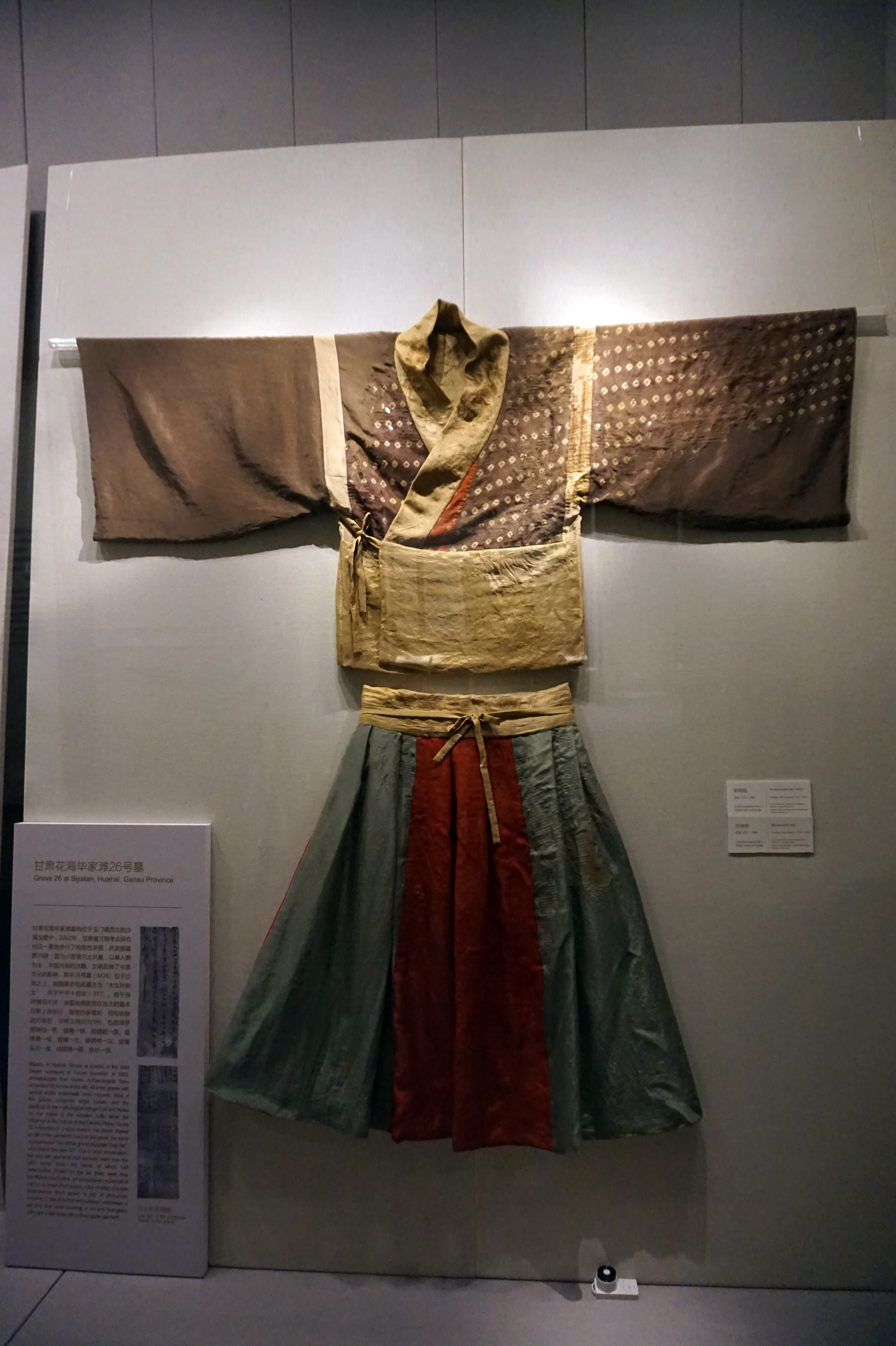
Ruqun, from a Former Qin tomb

Due to the frequent wars in this era, mass migration occurred and resulted in several ethnics living together with communication exchange; as such, this period marked an important time of cultural integration and cultural blending, including the cultural exchange of clothing. Han Chinese living in the south favoured the driving dress of the northern minorities, trousers and xi (褶; a tight sleeved, close fitting long jacket, length reaching below crotch and above knees), while the rulers from northern minorities favoured the court dress of the Han Chinese. Near the areas of the Yellow River, the popularity of the ethnic minorities' hufu was high, almost equal to the Han Chinese clothing, in the Sixteen Kingdoms and the Northern and Southern dynasties period.

Liangdang (两裆; 兩襠) is a type of undershirt or waistcoat worn in Northern China during the Sixteen Kingdoms period; it is not to be confused with a type of doubled-faced cuirass armour, also named liangdang, which was worn during this period.

During the Northern and Southern dynasties, the dressing style followed the style of the Three Kingdoms and Jin dynasty; robes, skirts, trousers, short jackets, sleeveless jackets were worn while fur coats, especially marten coats, were very rare. Young people liked to be dressed in trousers; however, it was not well-perceived for women to wear trousers; women wore skirts. Based on tomb figures dating from the Southern dynasties, it is known that the robes worn during those period continued the long, wide-sleeves, youren opening tradition. The robes continued to be fastened with a girdle and was worn over a straight-neck undergarment. Tomb figures depicted as servants in this period are also shown wearing skirts, aprons, trousers and upper garments with vertical opening or youren opening. Servants wore narrow-sleeved upper garment whereas attendants had wider sleeves which could be knotted above the wrist. The court dress was still xuanyi (玄衣; dark cloth); however, there were regulations in terms of fabric materials used.

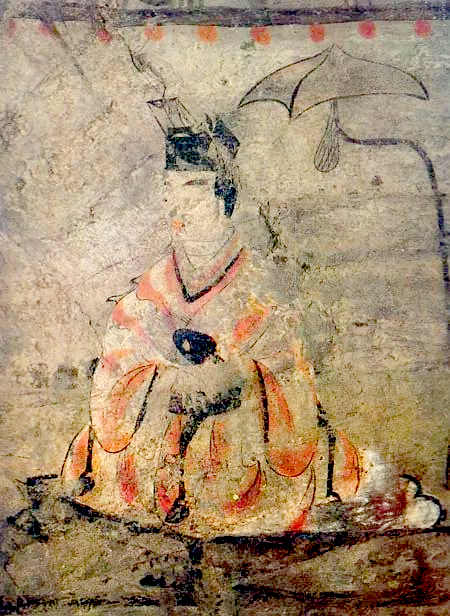
Portrait of an official wearing shenyi and jinxianguan from Dingjiazha Tomb No. 5.

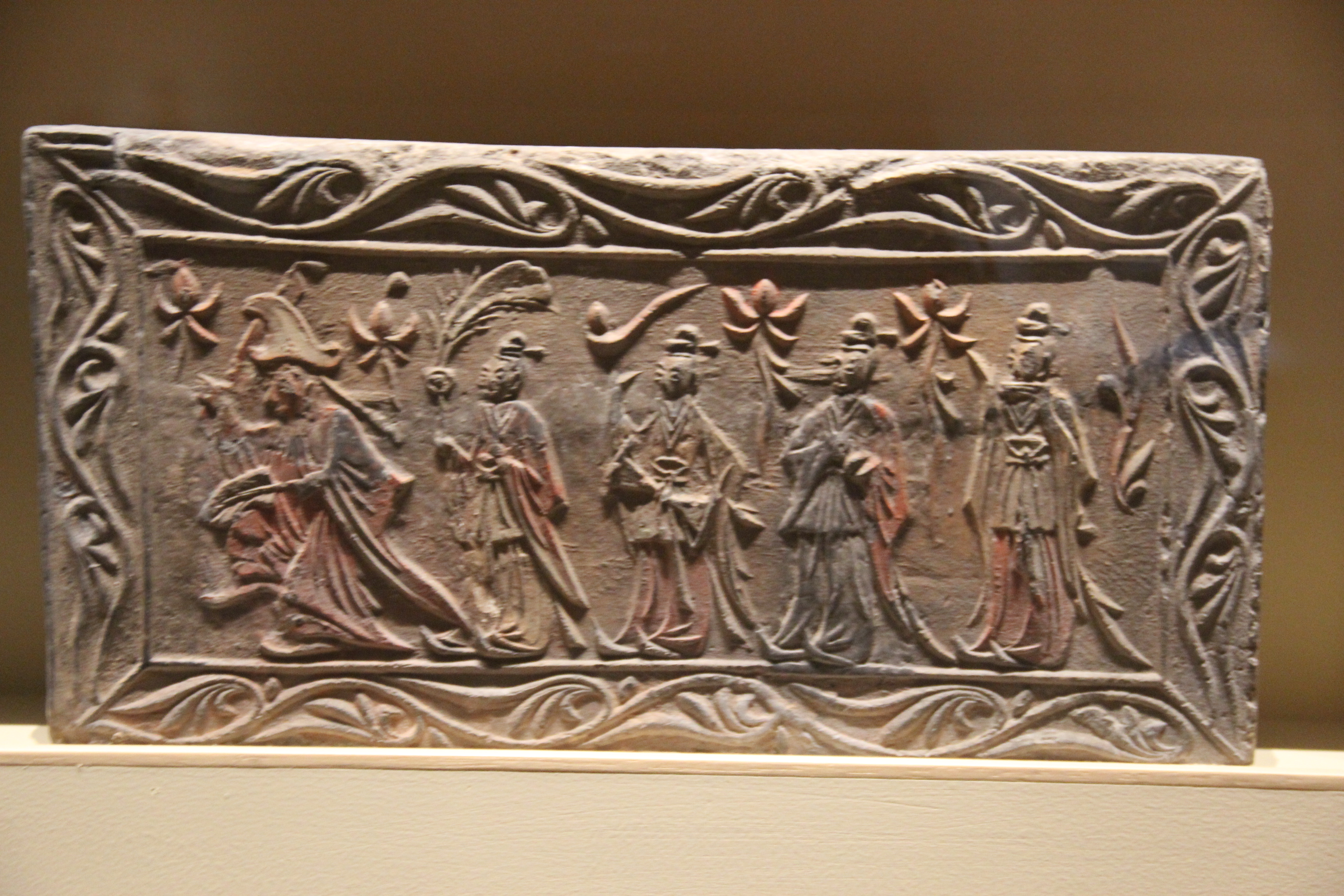
Men wearing kuzhe with xi depicted on a Southern dynasty brick relief, unearthed in Dengxian, Henan, 1958. depicted on a Southern dynasty brick relief, unearthed in Dengxian, Henan, 1958.

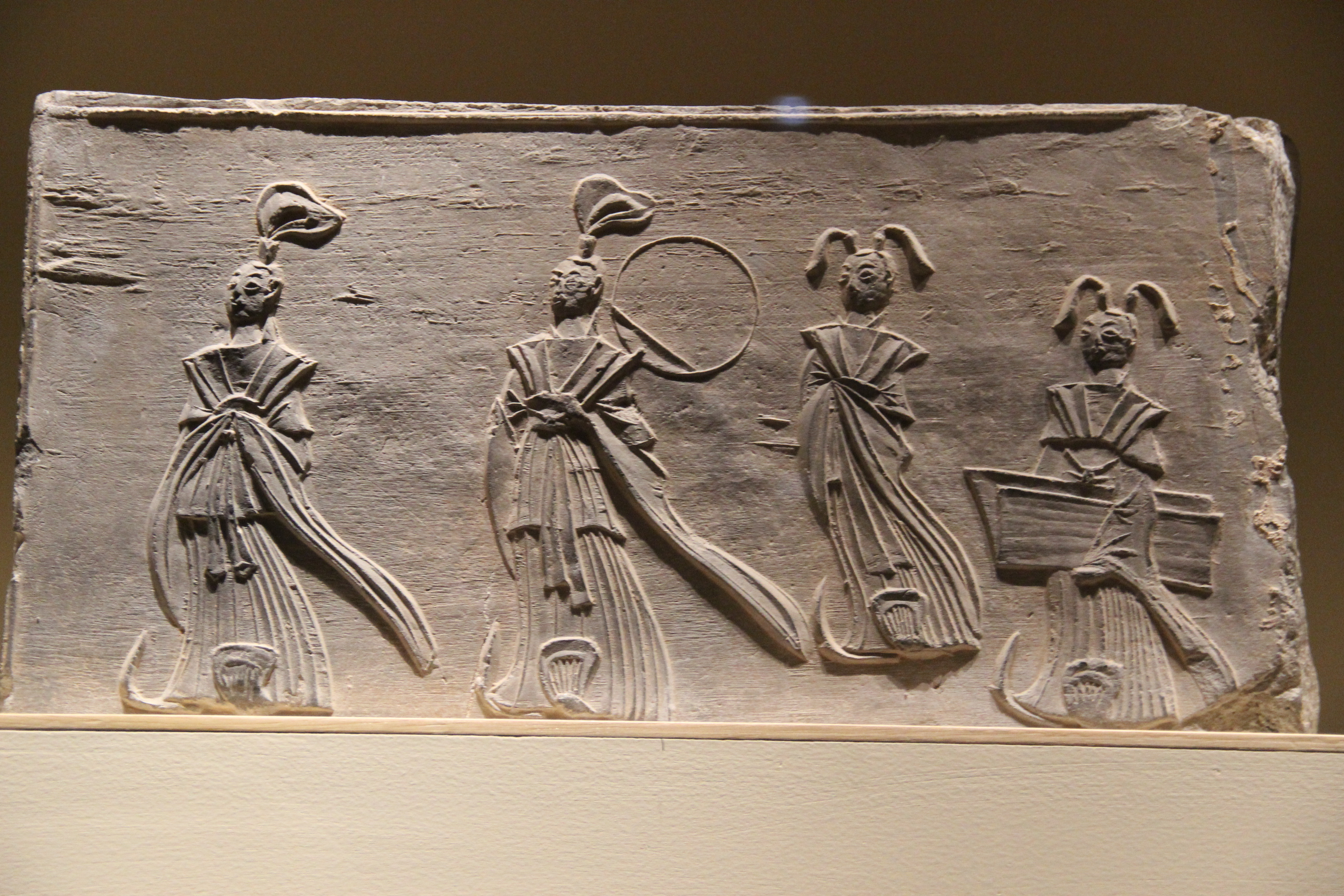
Scholars (and maids) wearing xi with robes (and shirt with long skirt) underneath, depicted on a Southern dynasty brick relief.

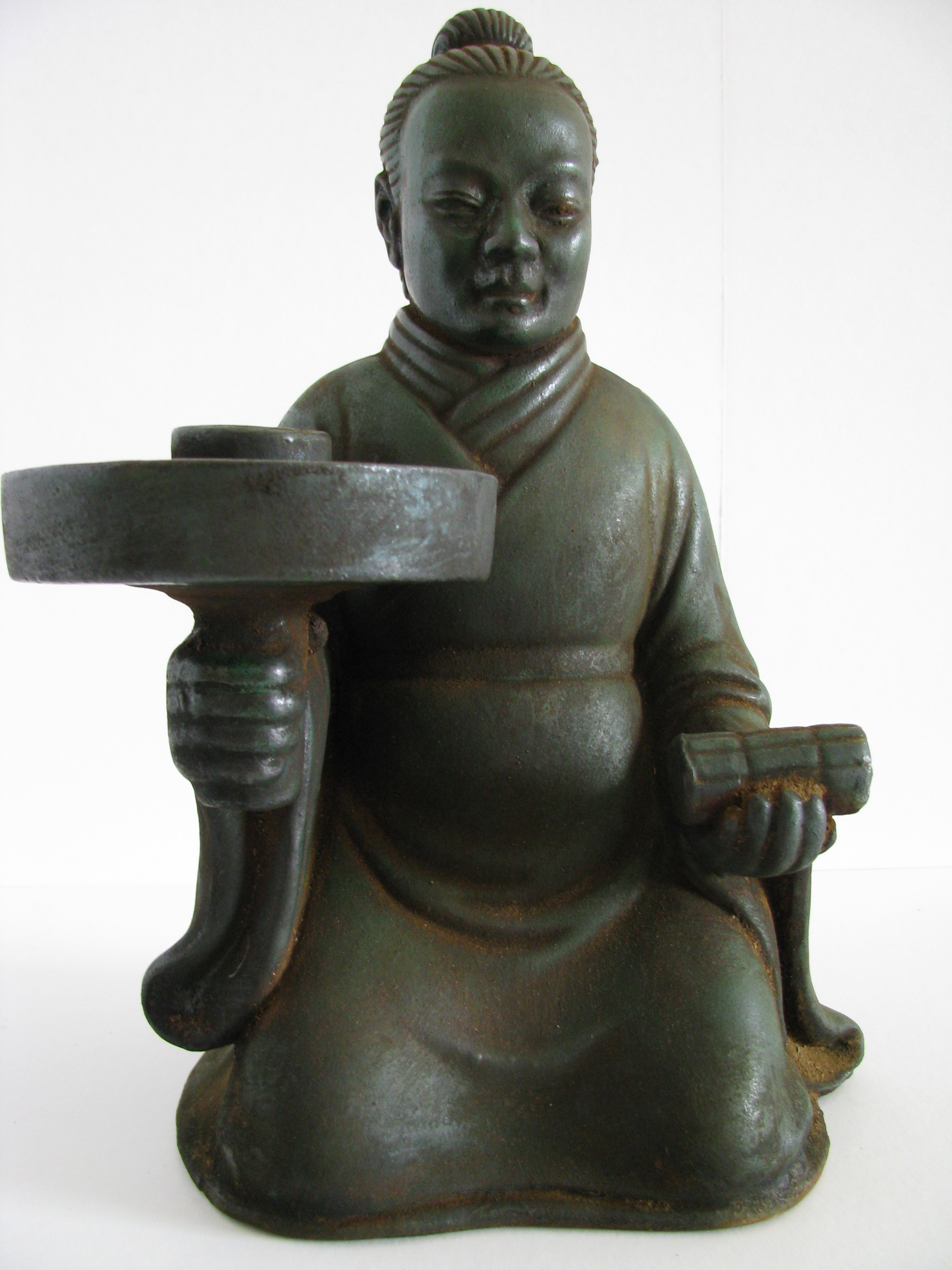
A candle stick holder depicting a man in a robe with a youren opening, Southern dynasty (420-589 AD).

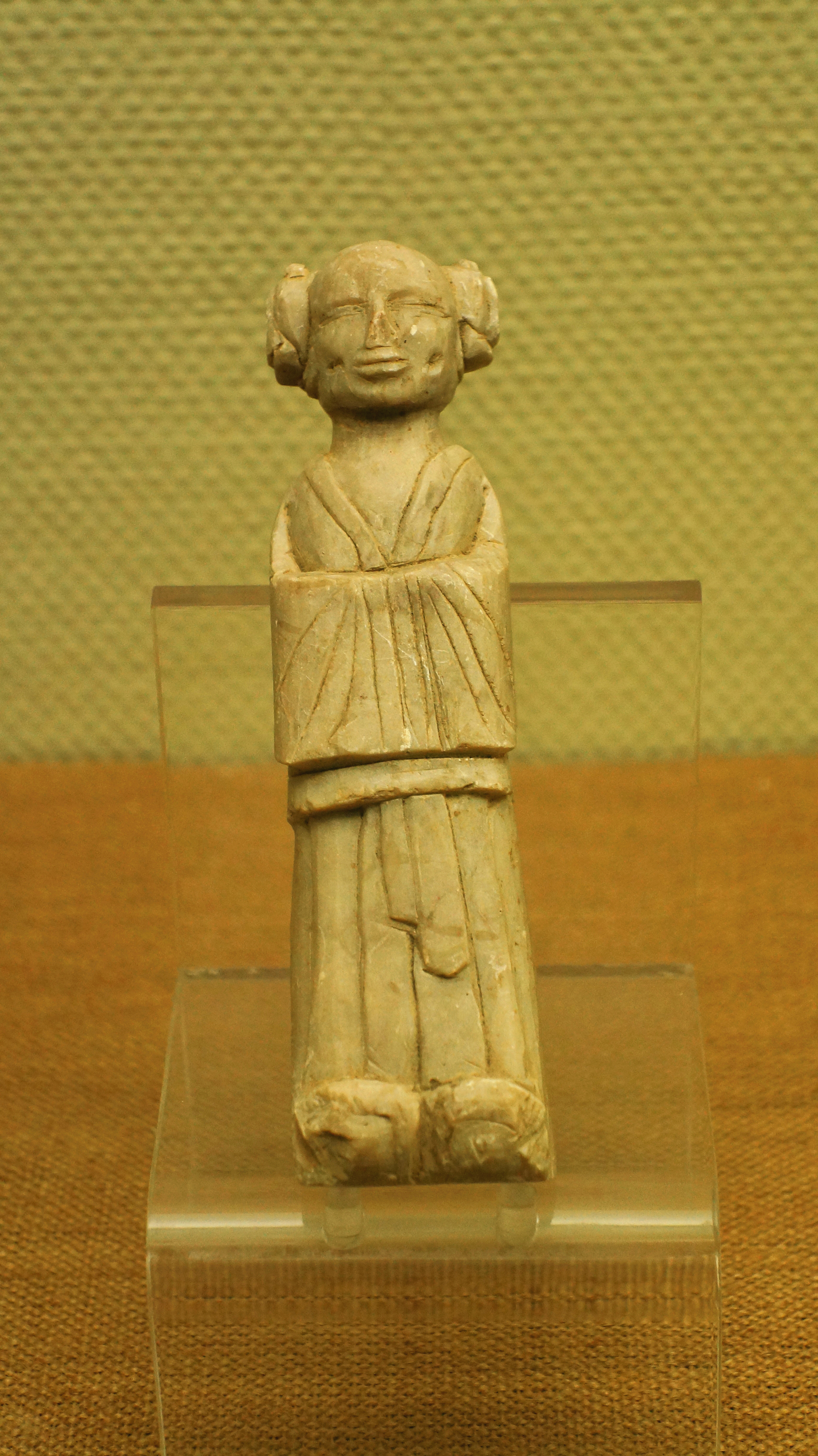
A female figure wearing a shanqun; the upper garment has a vertical opening, Liang dynasty, Southern dynasty.

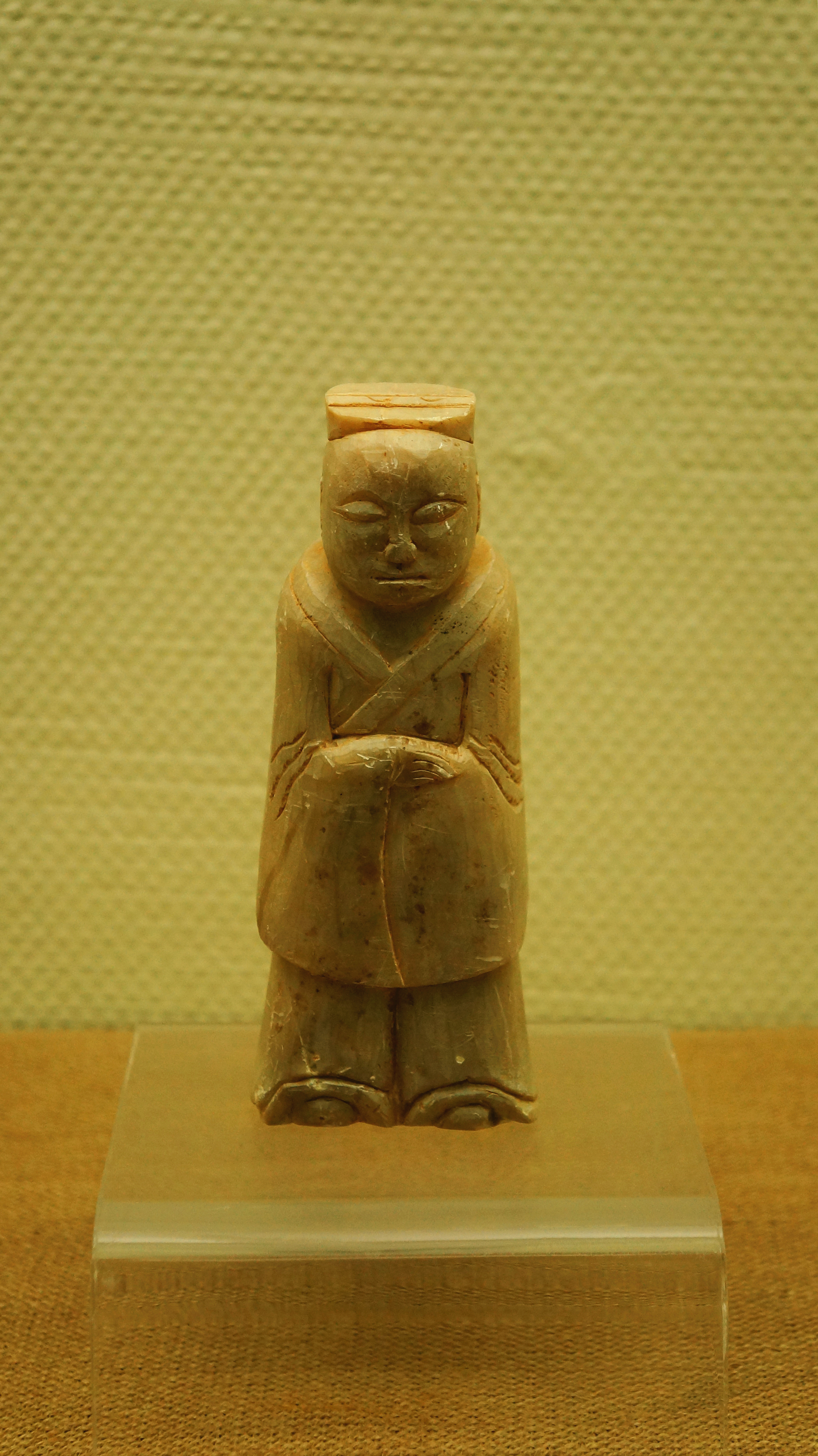
A male figure wearing a youren opening upper garment and trousers, Liang dynasty, Southern dynasty.

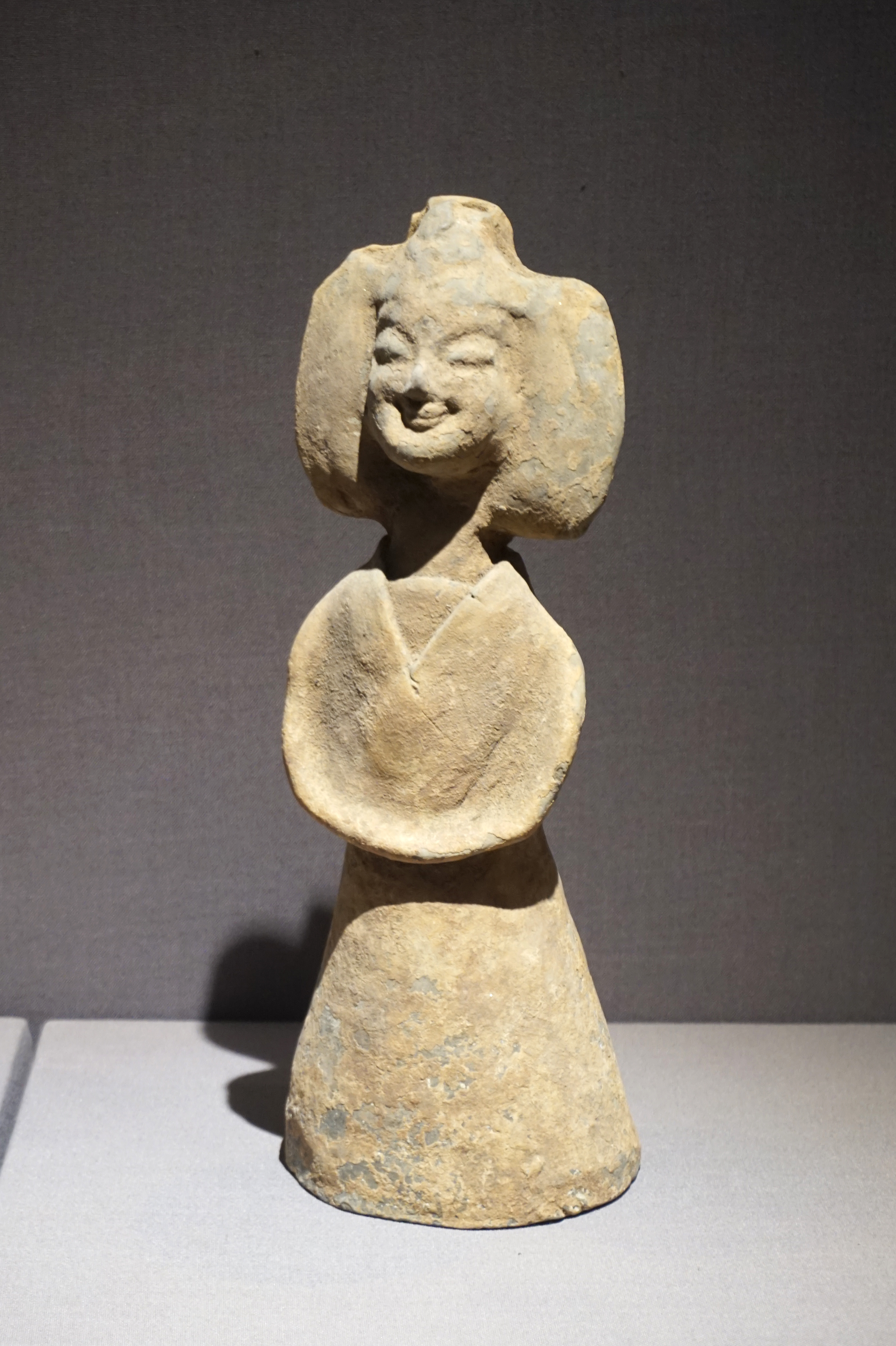
Earthenware Nanjing female figure wearing youren upper garment and a skirt with a straight-necked undergarment; d. Southern dynasty.

In the Northern dynasties (386 – 581 AD), ordinary women always wore short jackets and coats. The ethnic Xianbei founded the Northern Wei dynasty in 398 A.D. and continued to wear their traditional, tribal nomadic clothing to denote themselves as members of the ruling elite until c. 494 A.D. when Emperor Xiaowen of Northern Wei decreed a prohibition of Xianbei clothing among many other prohibition on Xianbei culture (e.g. language, Xianbei surnames) as a form of sinicization policies and allowed the intermarriage between Xianbei and Chinese elites. The Wei shu even claimed that the Xianbei rulers were descendants of Yellow Emperor, just like the Han Chinese, despite being non-Chinese. The Wei shu also records that Emperor Xiaowen of Northern Wei promoted Chinese-style long robes and official crowns in the court to display the wearer's rank and his hierarchical position in the court and ritual functions. For example, both male and female patrons appeared in Xianbei-style attire during the 5th century AD, this can be seen particular at the Yungang caves temples near Datong and in the earliest carvings at Longmen, whereas in the first third of the 6th century, the patrons tend to appear in Chinese-style clothing in the majority of Northern Wei caves at Longmen; this change in clothing style has been suggested to be the result of sinicization policies regarding the adoption of Chinese-style clothing in the Northern Wei court. Earliest images of nomadic Xianbei-style dress in China tend to be depicted as a knee-length tunic with narrow sleeves, with a front opening, which can typically be collarless, round-collared, and sometimes be V-neck collared; men and women tend to wear that knee-length tunic over trousers for men and long, ground-length skirts for women. When their tunics had lapelled, the lapel opening was typically zuoren. Xianbei people also wore Xianbei-style cloaks and xianbei hat (鮮卑帽; xianbei mao).

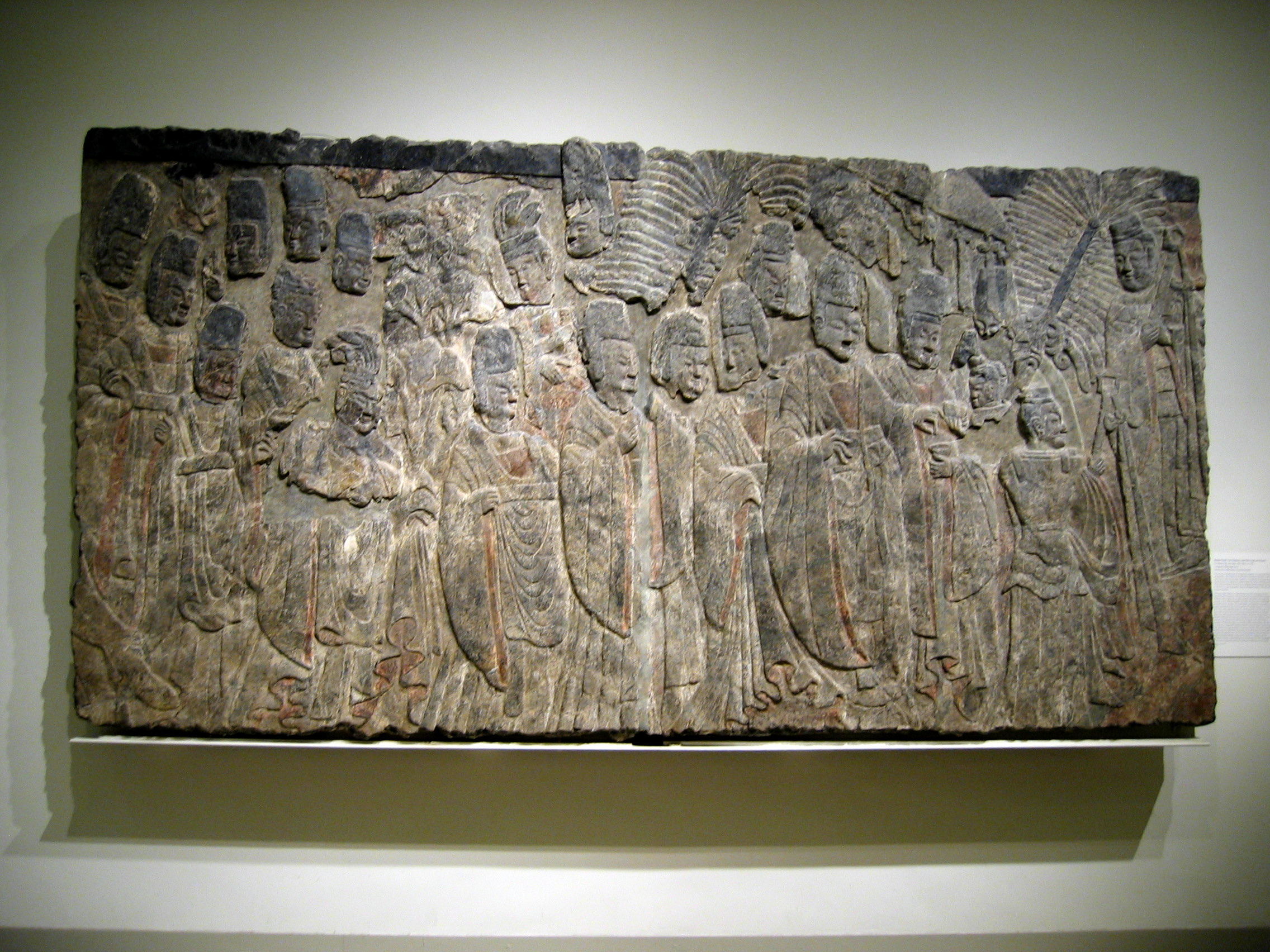
Emperor Xiaowen with his entourage, Central Bingyang cave, Longmen, Zhejiang; Northern Wei c.522-523.

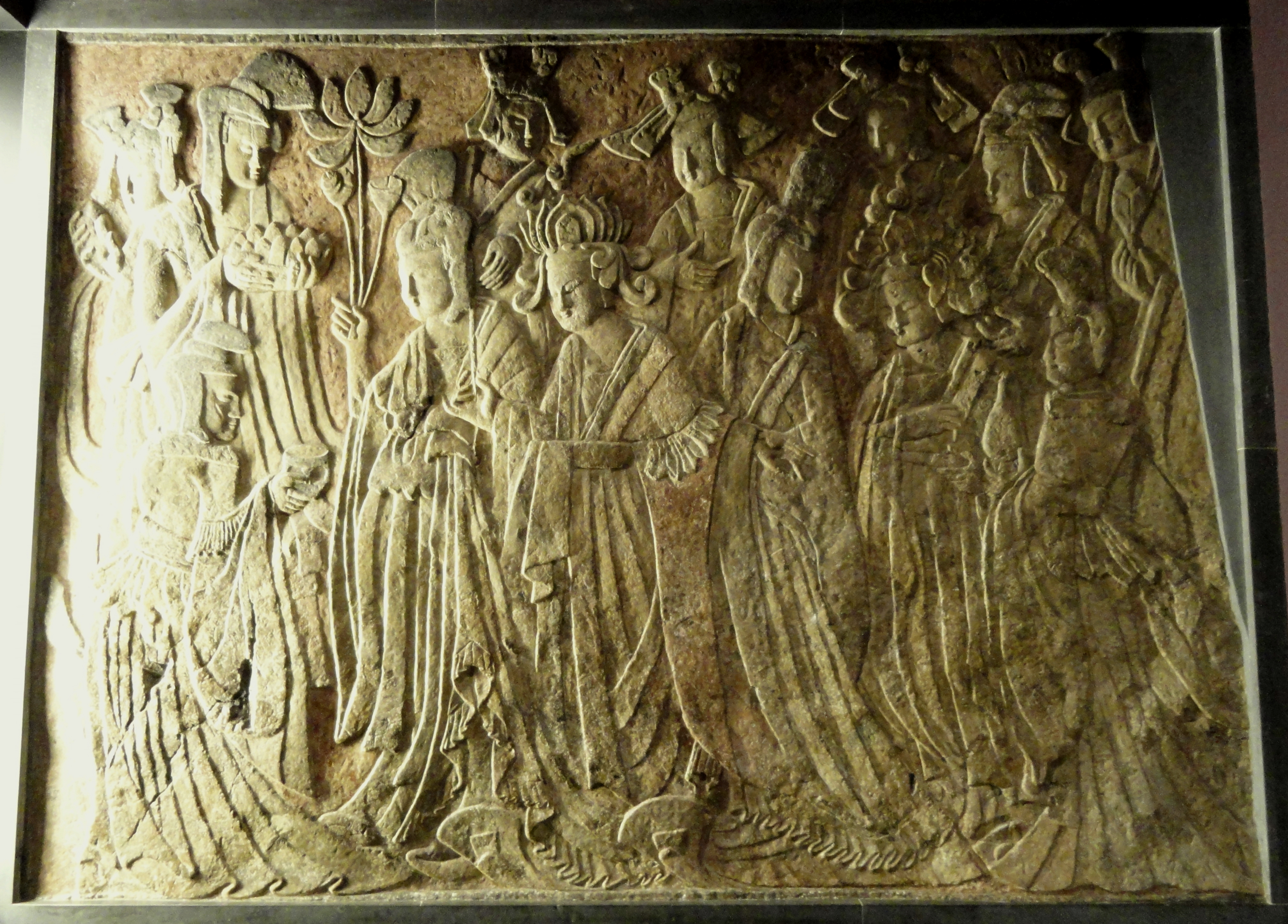
Procession of the Empress as Donor with Her Court, Chinese, from the Binyang Cave, Longmen, Henan Province, Northern Wei Dynasty, c. 522 AD.

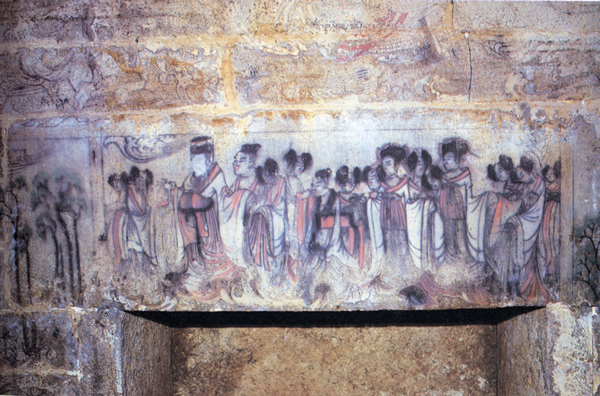
Procession of tomb occupant and his wives, mural painting from the tomb of General Cui Fen; Northern Qi.

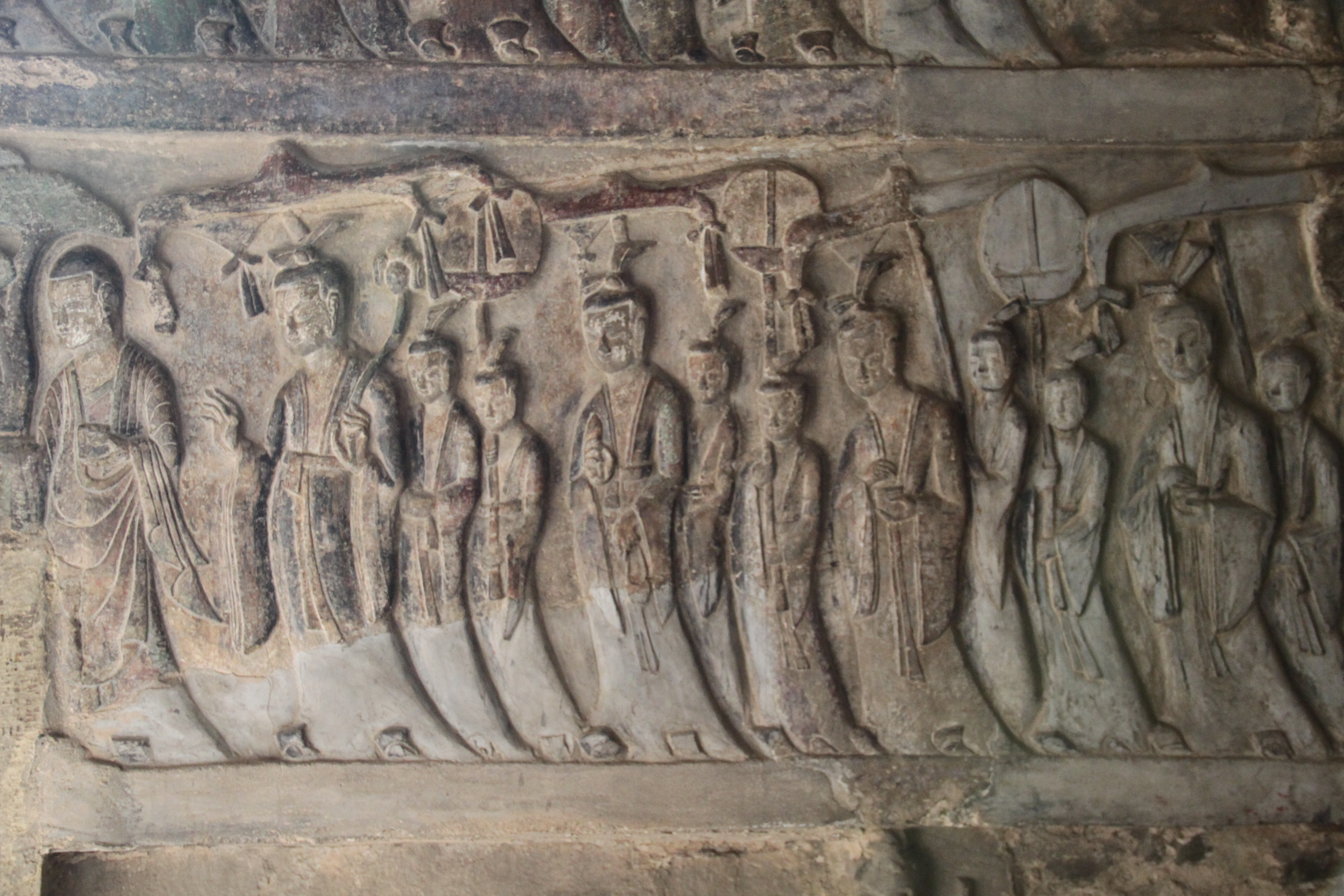
Procession, Gongyi, Henan Province, Northern Wei dynasty.

A pottery figure wearing Han Chinese style attire, Northern Wei (471 – 499 AD). The garment has a youren opening.

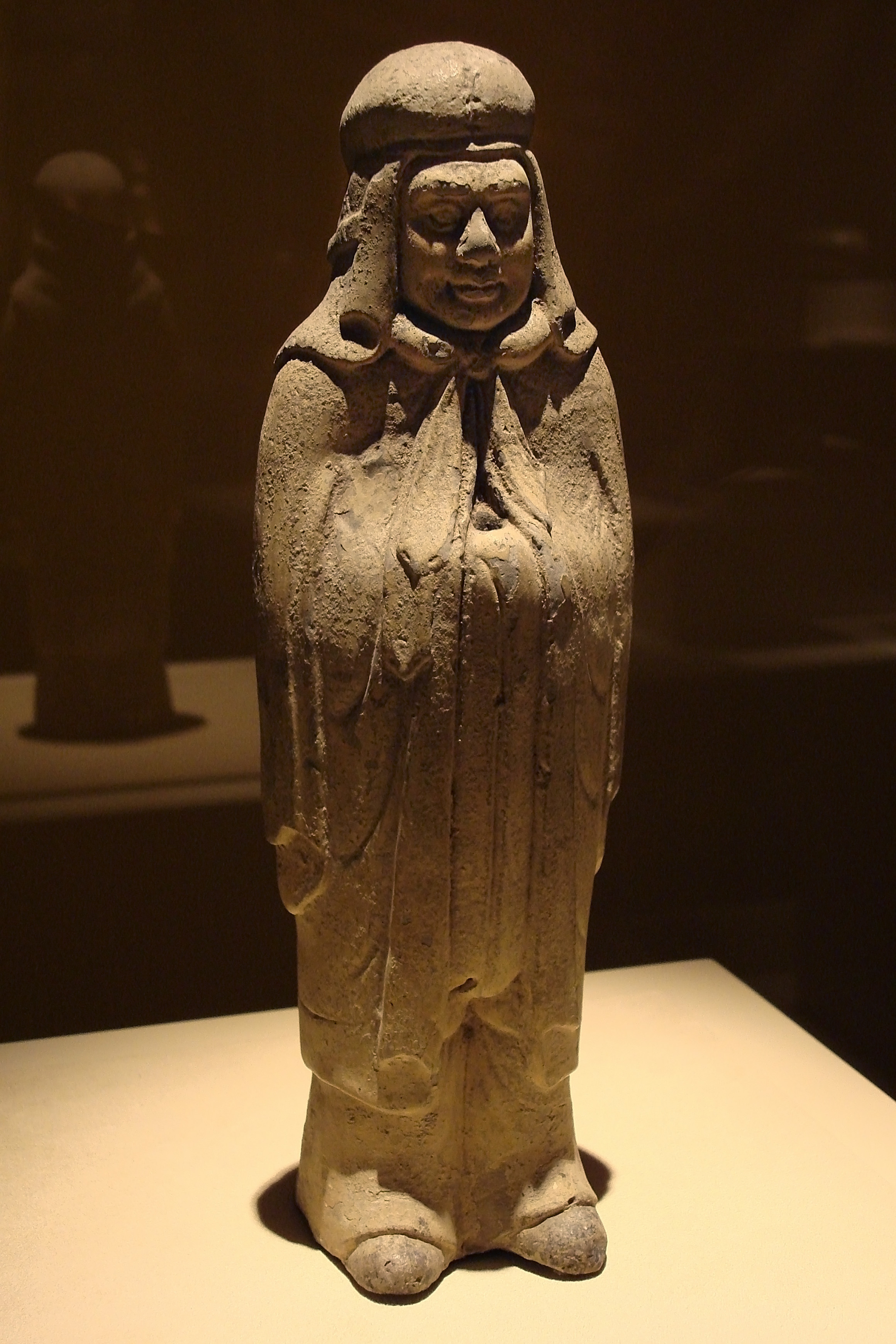
Male xianbei warrior wearing a cloak and xianbei hat, Northern Wei dynasty.

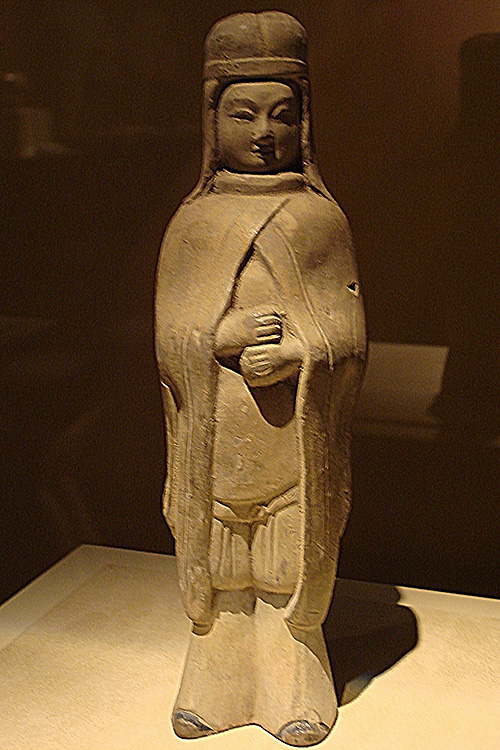
Female xianbei warrior wearing a cloak and xianbei hat, Northern Wei dynasty.

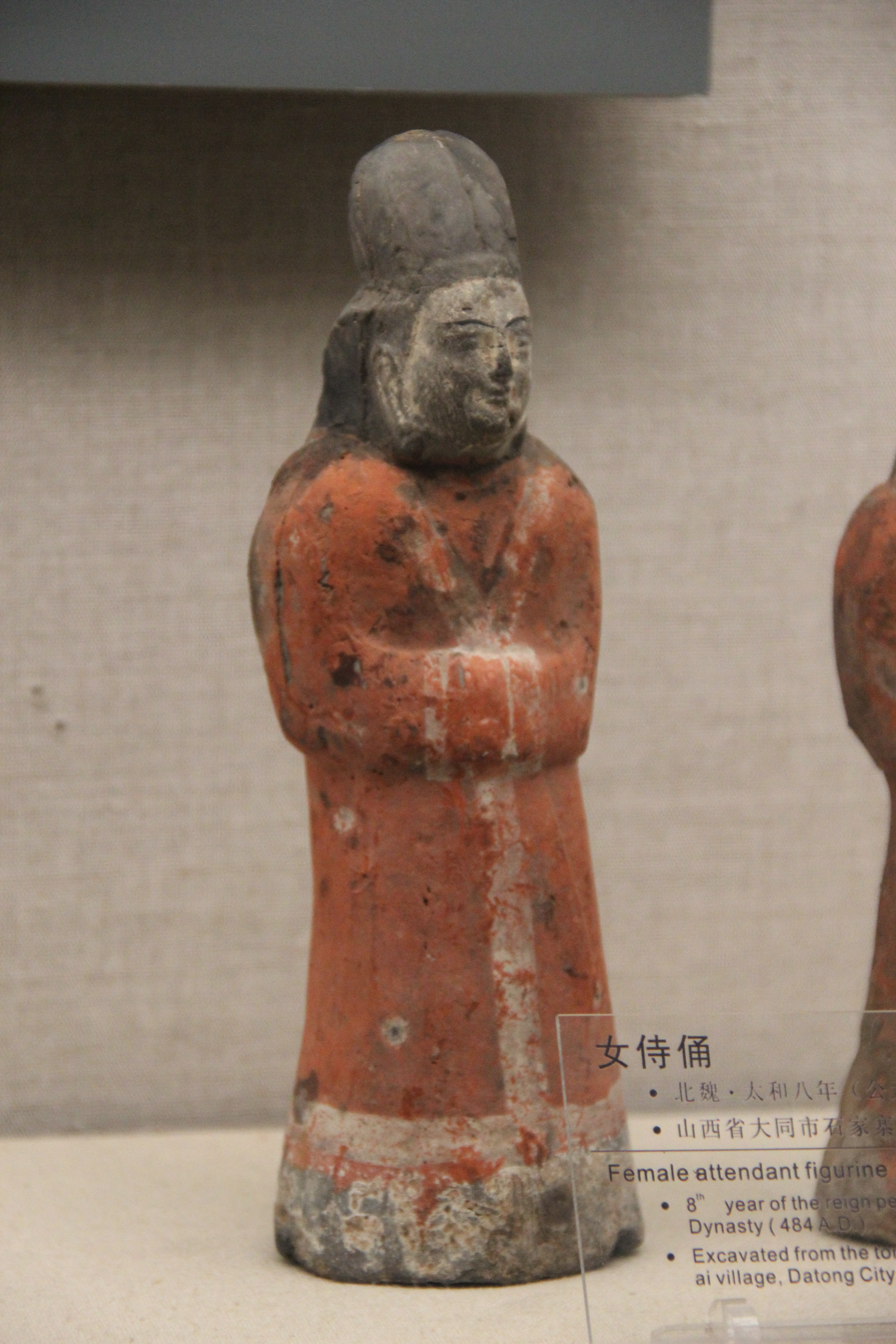
Example of a female attendant wearing an early Xianbei garb, the opening is zuoren, unearthed in Sima Jinlong tomb, Northern Wei, 484 AD.

Despite the sinicization policies attempted by the Northern Wei court, the nomadic style clothing continued to exist in China until Tang dynasty. For example, narrow and tight sleeves, which was well adapted to nomadic life-style, started to be favoured and was adopted by Han Chinese. In the Shuiyusi temple of Xiangtangshan Caves dated back to Northern dynasties, male worshippers are usually dressed in Xianbei style attire while women are dressed in Han Chinese style attire wearing skirts and high-waisted, wrap-style robes with wide sleeves. Moreover, after the fall of the Northern Wei, tensions started to rise between the Western Wei (which was more sinicized) and the Eastern Wei (which was less sinicized and resented the sinicized court of Northern Wei). Due to the shift in politics, Han and non-Han Chinese ethnic tensions arose between the successor states of Northern Wei; and Xianbei-style clothing reappeared; however, their clothing had minor changes.

At the end of the Northern and Southern dynasties, foreign immigrants started to settle in China; most of those foreign immigrants were traders and buddhists missionaries from Central Asia. Cultural diversity was also the most striking feature in China in the sixth-century AD. From the mural paintings found in the Tomb of Xu Xianxiu of the Northern Qi, various types of attire are depicted which reflect the internationalism and multiculturalism of the Northern Qi; many of the attire styles are derived from Central Asia or nomadic designs. The wife of Xu Xianxiu is depicted with a flying-bird bun; she is wearing a Han Chinese cross-collared, wide-sleeves attire which has the basic clothing design derived from the Han dynasty attire with some altered designs, such as a high waistline and wide standing collar. Xu Xianxiu is depicted wearing a Central Asian-style coat, Xianbei-style tunic, trousers, and boots. Some of the female servants depicted from the tomb murals of Xu Xianxiu are wearing what appears to be Sogdian dresses, which tend to be associated with dancing girls and low-status entertainers during this period, while the ladies-in-waiting of Xu Xianxiu's wife are wearing narrow-sleeved clothing which look more closely related to Xianbei-style or Central Asian-style clothing; yet this Xianbei style of attire is different from the depictions of Xianbei-style attire worn before 500 AD. The men (i.e. soldiers, grooms and male attendants) in the mural paintings of Xu Xianxiu tomb are depicted wearing high black or brown boots, belts, headgears, and clothing which follows the Xianbei-style, i.e. V-neck, long tunic which is below knee-length, with the left lapel of the front covering the right; narrow-sleeved tunic which is worn on top of round-collared undergarment are also depicted. High-waisted skirt style, which likely came from Central Asia, was also introduced to Han Chinese during the Northern Wei dynasty.

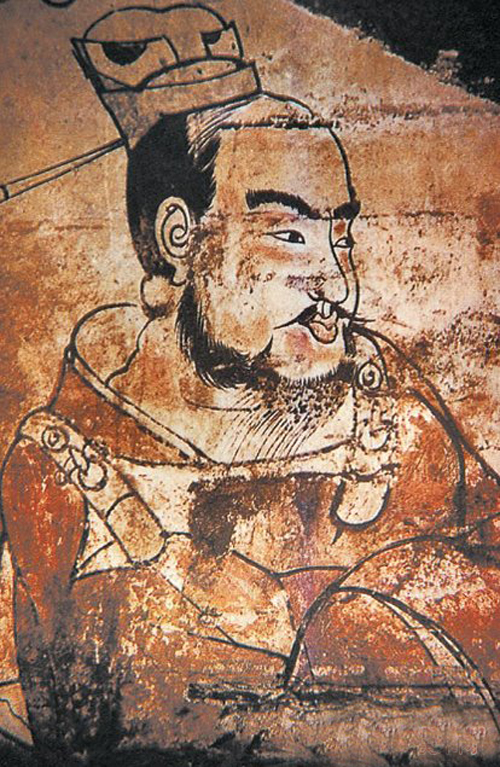
A Northern Qi dynasty mural of a gate guard from the tomb of Lou Rui (婁叡).

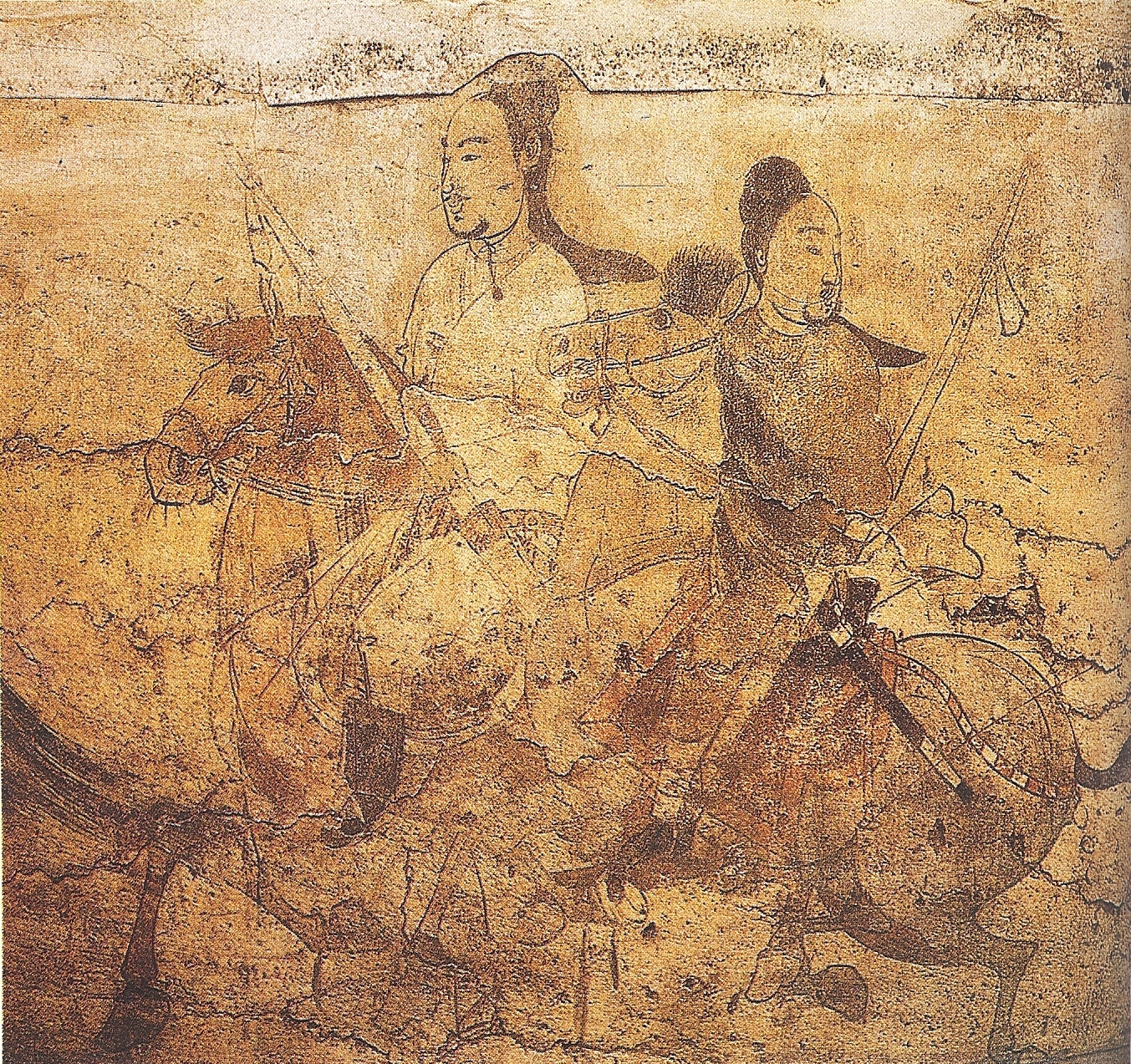
Riders on Horseback; Tomb of Lou Rui, Northern Qi dynasty.

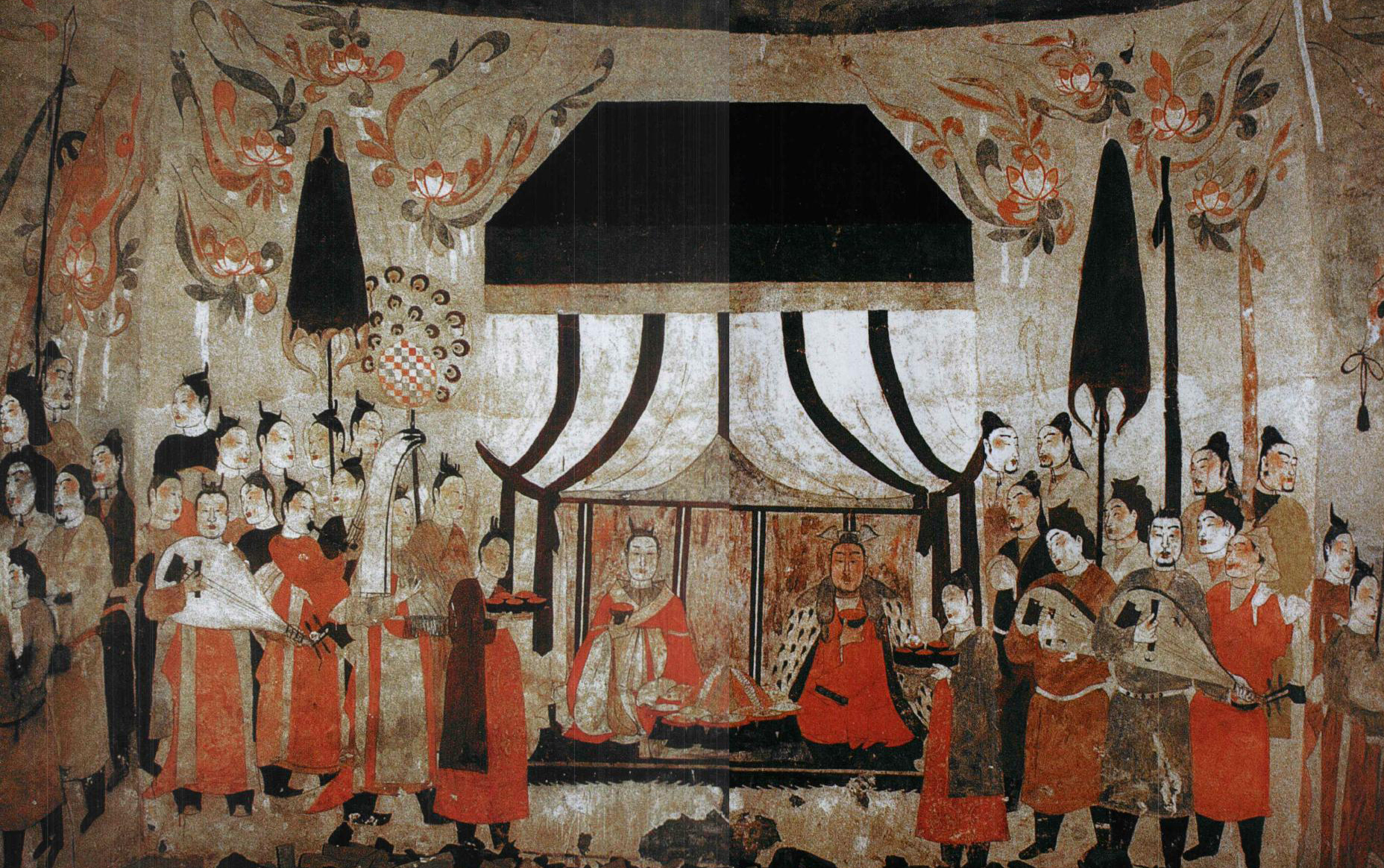
The wife of Xu Xianxiu is wearing Han Chinese style clothing which derived from Han prototype with altered details such as high-waist and wide standing collar; Mural from Xu Xianxiu Tomb, Northern Qi, 571 AD.

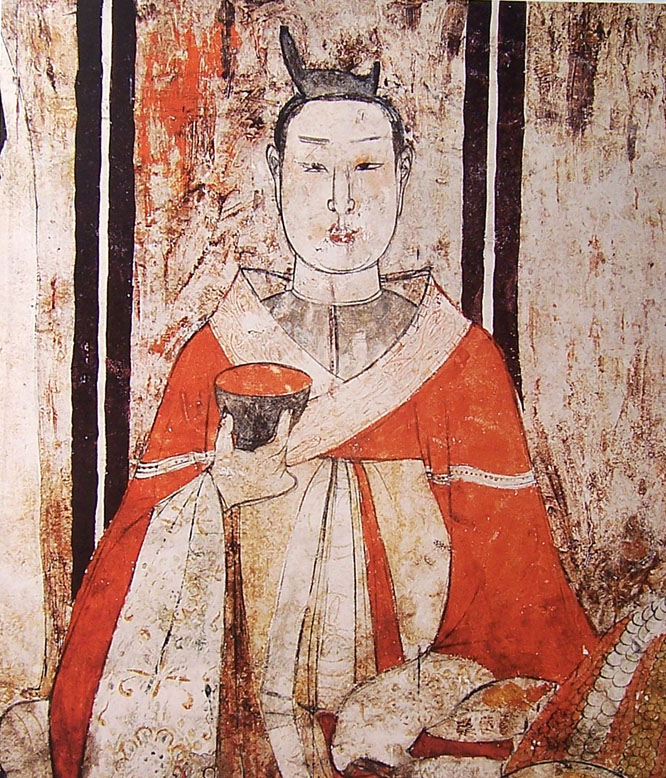
The wife of the Xu Xianxiu in Han Chinese-style clothing, Mural painting from Xu Xianxiu Tomb, Northern Qi, 571 AD.

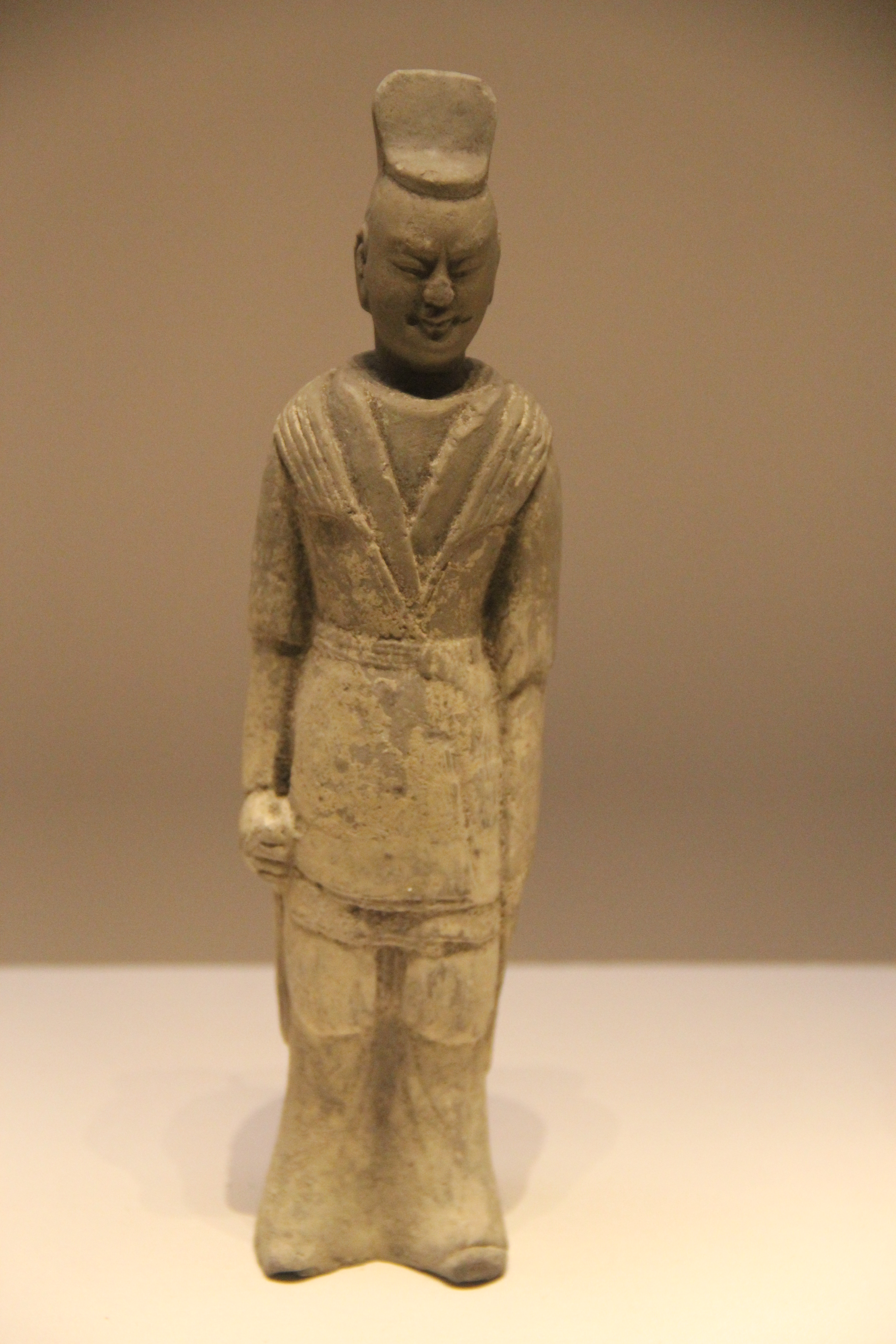
A warrior in Xianbei-style costume, Northern Qi. The opening of the upper garment is zuoren.

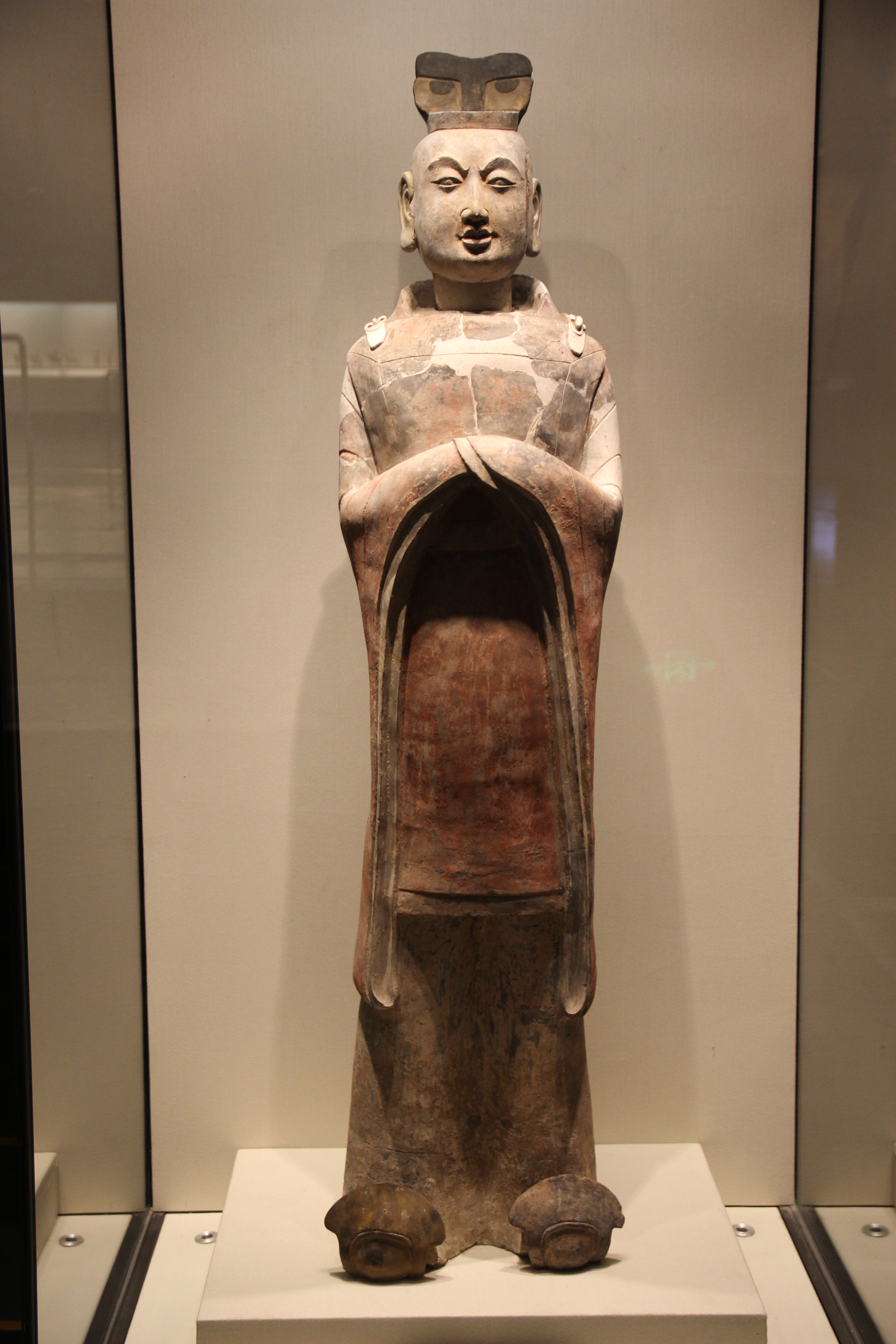
Northern dynasties attendant wearing pingshangze and liangdang (裲裆)

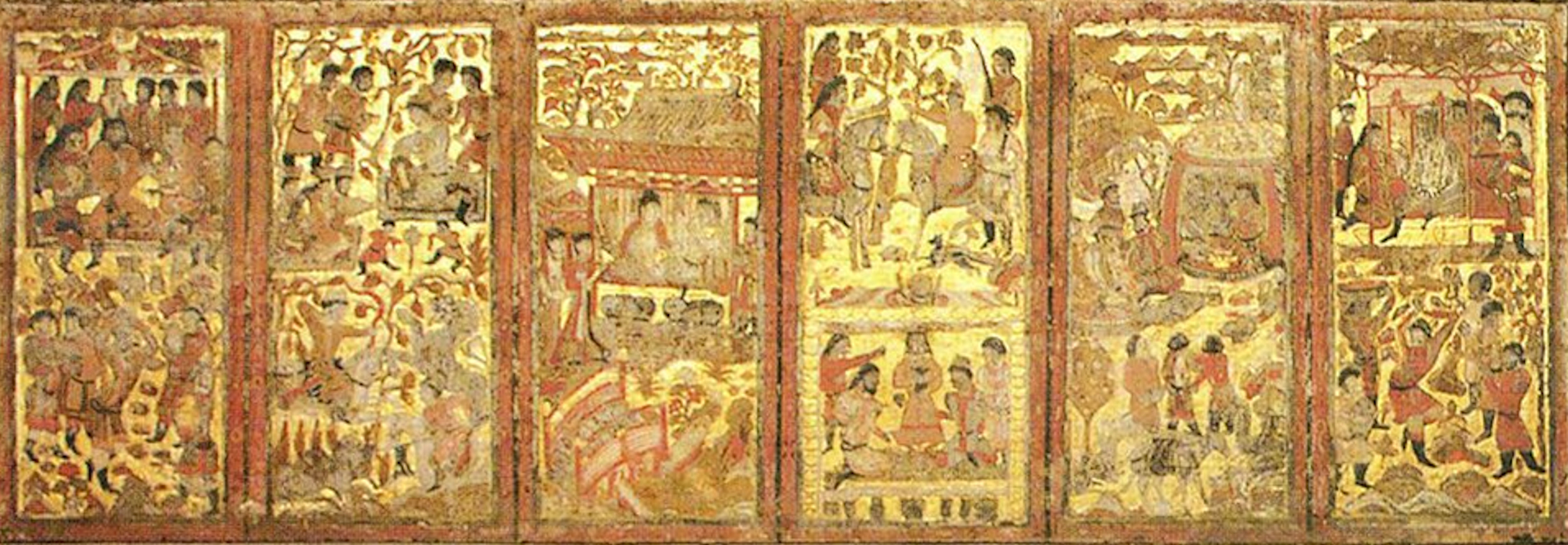
Sogdian figures, wearing Sogdian clothing, Tomb of An Jia, 579 CE.

Of note, significant changes occurred to the form of the garments which had been originally introduced by the Xianbei and other Turkic people who had settled in northern China after the fall of the Han dynasty; for example, in the arts and literature which dates from the 5th century, their male clothing appeared to represent the ethnicity of its wearer, but in the 6th century, the attire lost its ethnic significance and did not denote its wearer as Xianbei or non-Chinese. Instead, the nomadic dress had turned into a type of male ordinary dress in the Sui and early Tang dynasties regardless of ethnicity. On the other hand, the Xianbei women gradually abandoned their ethnic Xianbei clothing and adopted Han Chinese-style and Central Asian-style clothing to the point that by the Sui dynasty, women in China were no longer wearing steppe clothing.

=== Sui, Tang, Five dynasties and Ten kingdoms period ===
The Sui and the Tang dynasties developed the pinsefu (品色服), which was a colour grading clothing system to differentiate social ranking; this colour grading system for clothing then continued to be developed in the subsequent dynasties.

==== Sui dynasty ====
Following the unification of China under the Sui dynasty, the Sui court abolished the Northern Zhou rituals and adopted the rituals, practices and ideas of the Han and Cao Wei dynasties, and the clothing code of the Han dynasty was restored. The Sui system was also based on the system of Western Jin and Northern Qi. The first emperor of Sui, Emperor Gaozu, would wear tongtianfu on grand occasions, gunyi (衮衣; dragon robe) on suburban rites and visits to ancestral temple. He also set the colour red as the authoritative colour of the court imperial robes; this included the clothing of emperors and the ceremonial clothing of the princes. Crimson was the colour of martial clothing (i.e. chamber guards, martial guards, generals and duke generals) whereas servants would wear purple clothing, which consisted of hood and loose trousers. During Emperor Gaozu's time, the court official garment was similar to the clothing attire of the commoners, except that it was yellow in colour. Court censors during Emperor Gaozu wore the quefeiguan.

Emperor Yangdi later reformed the dress code in accordance of the ancient customs and news sets of imperial clothing were made. In 605 AD, it was decreed that officials over the fifth-ranks had to dress in crimson or purple, and in 611 AD, any officials who would follow the emperor in expedition together had to wear martial clothing. In 610 AD, the kuzhe attire worn by attending officials worn during imperial expeditions was replaced by the rongyi (戎衣) attire. Emperor Yangdi also wore several kind of imperial headgears, such as wubian, baishamao (白紗帽; white gauze cap), and the wushamao. Civil officials wore jinxianguan, and the wushamao was popular and was worn from court officials to commoners. The quefeiguan was also replaced by the xiezhiguan, which could also be used to denote the censor's rank based on the material used.

During the Sui dynasty, an imperial decree which regulated clothing colour stated that lower class could only wear muted blue or black clothing; upper class on the other hand were allowed to wear brighter colours, such as red and blue. Women wore ruqun consisting of short jackets and long skirts. The women's skirts were characterized with high waistline which created a silhouette which looked similar to the Empire dresses of Napoleonic France; however, the construction of the assemble differed from the ones worn in Western countries as Han Chinese women assemble consisted of a separate skirt and upper garment which show low décolletage. In this period, ordinary men did not wear skirts anymore.

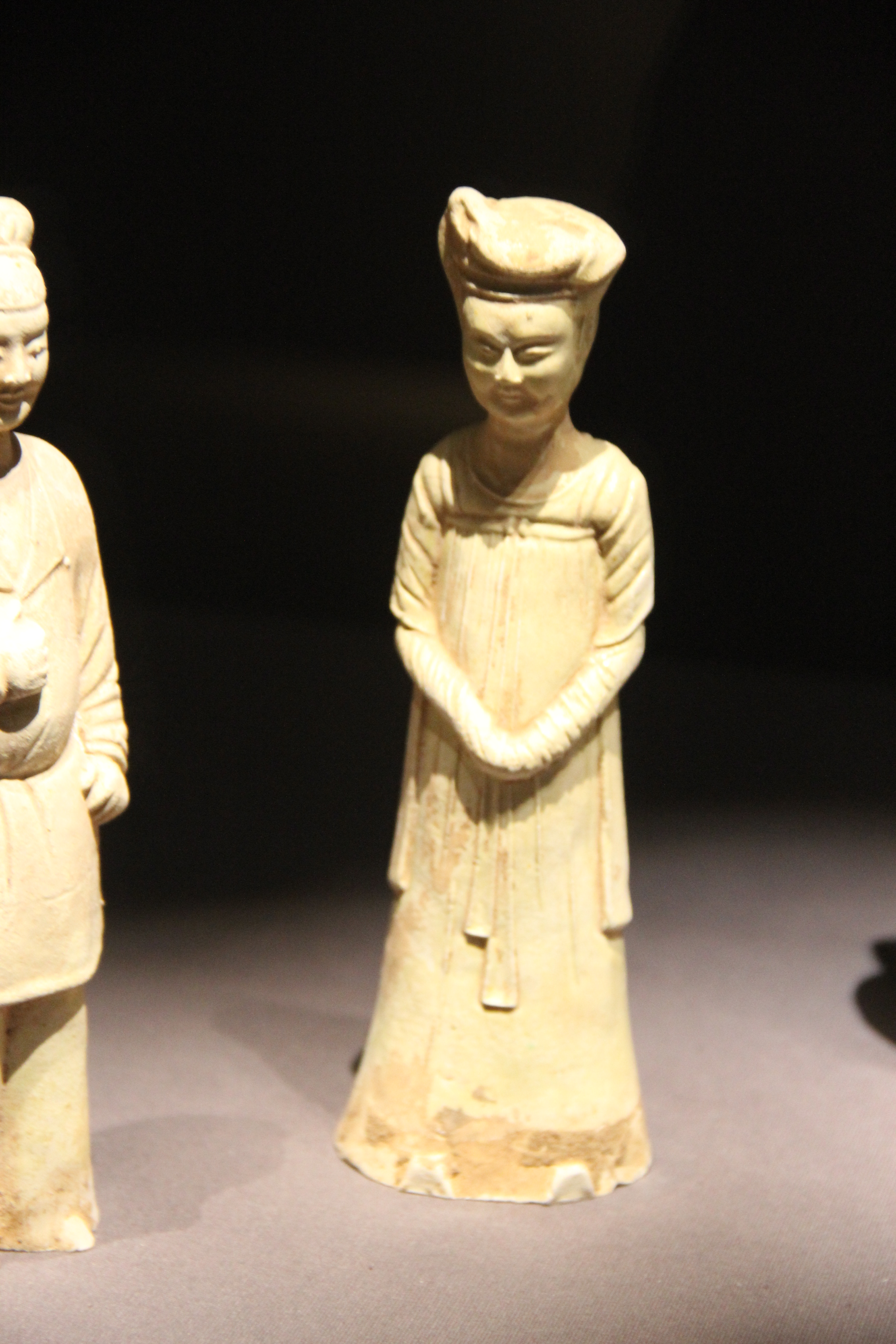
Painted pottery of a female attendant, Sui dynasty (581–618 AD)

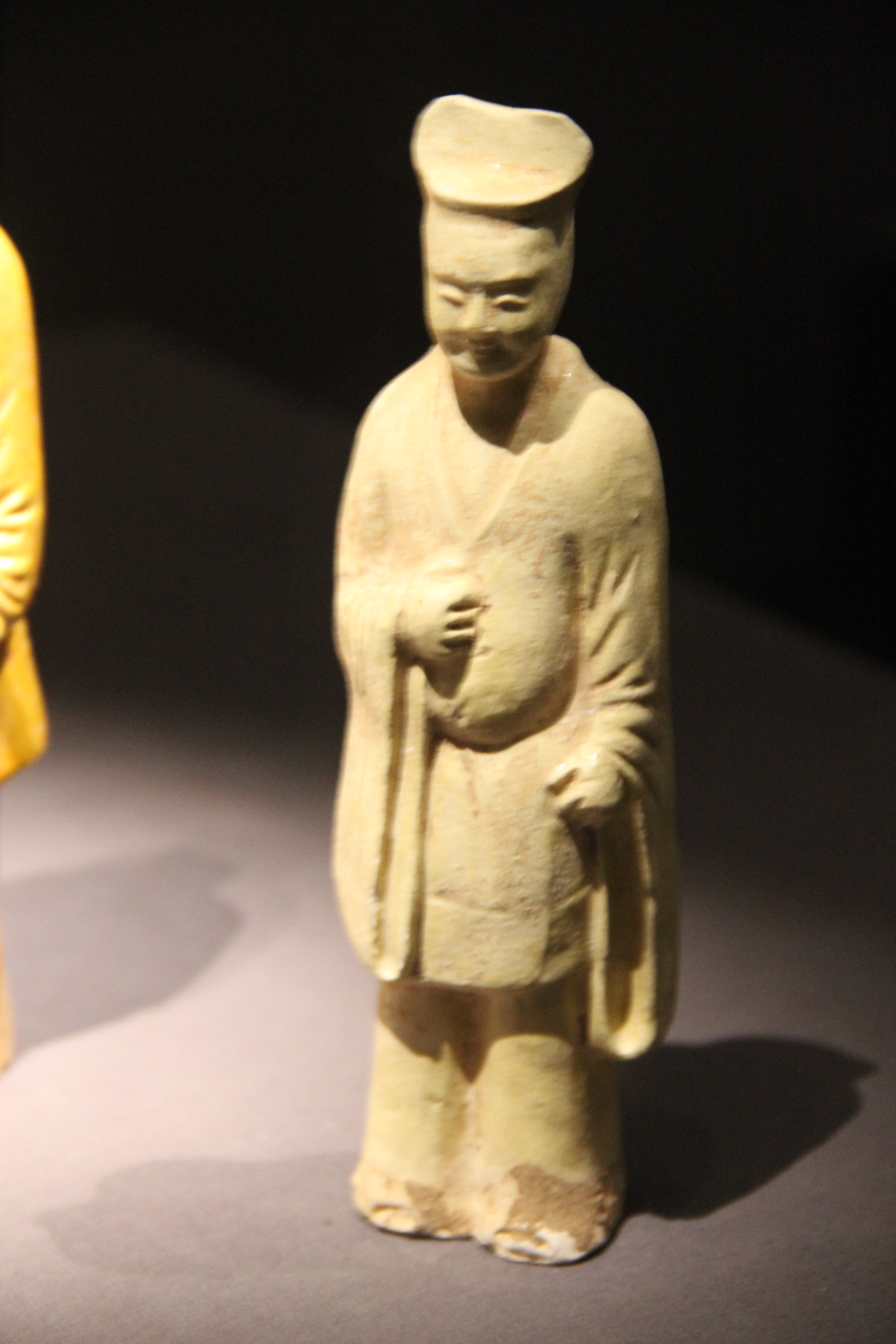
Painted pottery of a male attendant, Sui dynasty (581–618 AD)

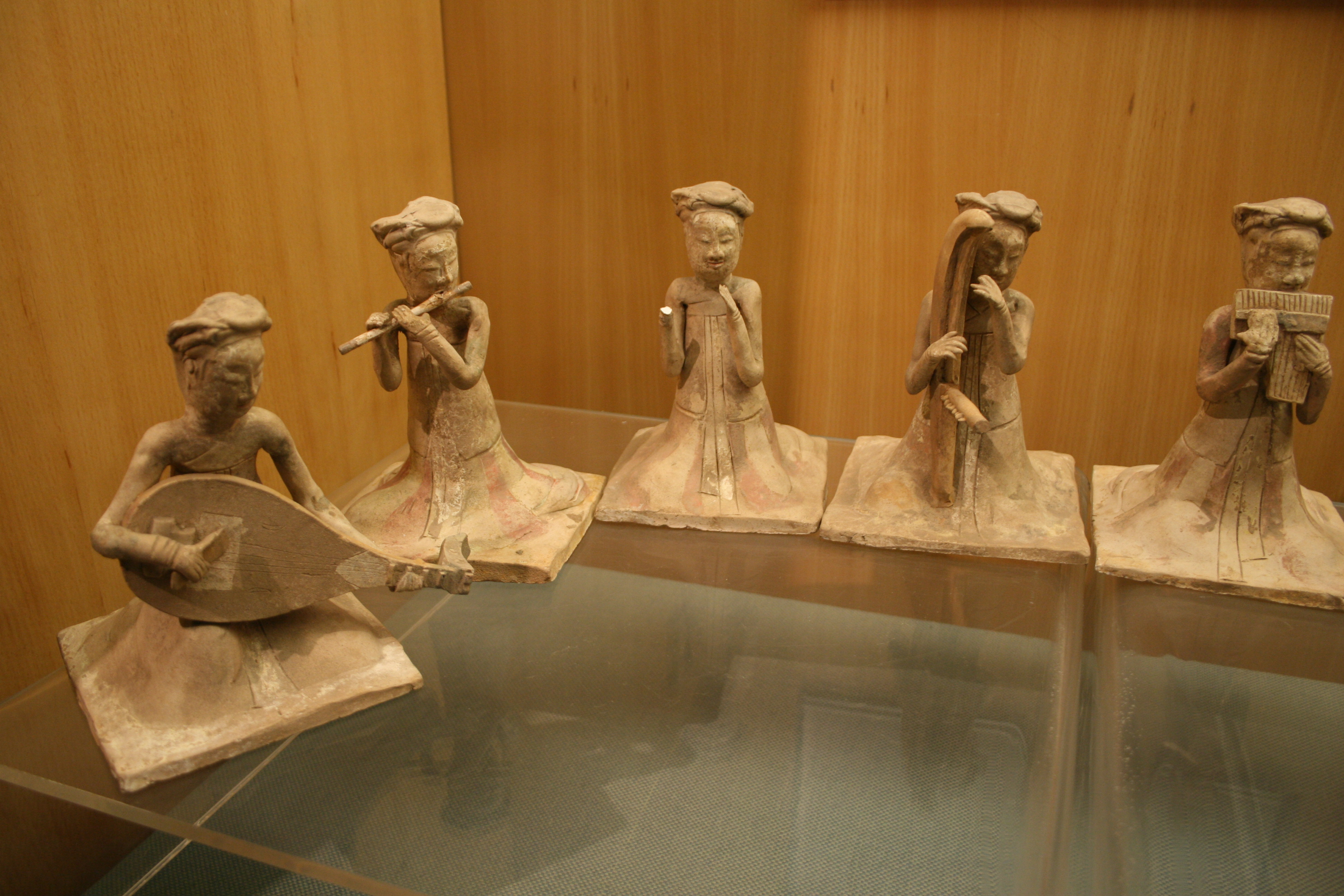
Female figurines of musicians, Sui dynasty from Zhang Sheng's Tomb

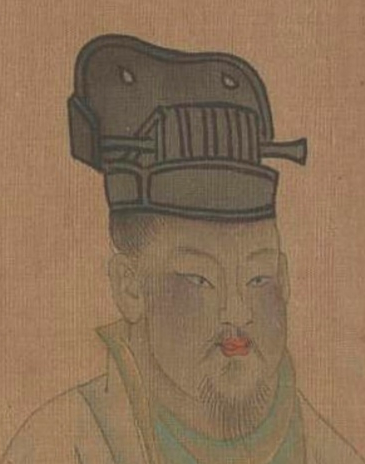
Jinxianguan, from Five Stars and Twenty-Eight Mansions (五星二十八宿真形图) painting by Liang Lingzan.
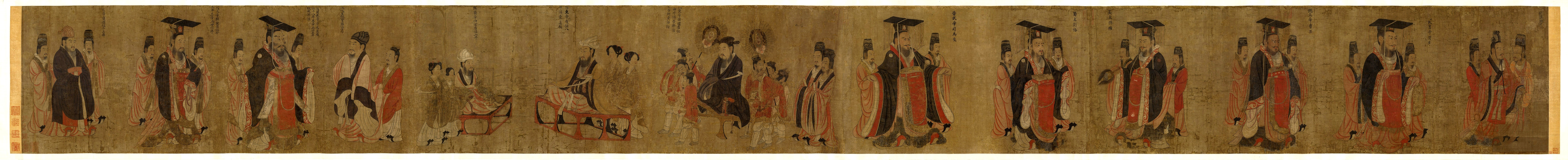
Thirteen Emperors Scroll (歷代帝王圖), depicting emperors in full regalia spanning several dynasties before and after the Sui

==== Tang dynasty and Five dynasties and Ten kingdoms period ====
Emperor Taizong of Tang in Xianbei-influenced Tang fashion. Taizong himself was half Xianbei by blood.

Many elements of the Tang dynasty clothing traditions was inherited from the Sui dynasty. During the Tang dynasty, yellow-coloured robes and shirts were reserved for emperors; a tradition which was kept until the Qing dynasty. Moreover, the subjects of the Tang dynasty were forbidden from using ochre yellow colour as Emperor Gaozu used this colour for his informal clothing. The guan was replaced by futou. Scholars and officials wore the futou along with the Panling Lanshan. Clothing colours and fabric materials continued to play a role in differentiating ranks; for example, officials of the three upper levels and princes had to wear purple robes; officials above the fifth level had to wear red robes; officials of the sixth and seventh level had to wear green robes; and officials of the eighth and ninth levels had to wear cyan robes. Dragons-with-three-claws emblems also started to be depicted on the clothing of court officials above third ranks and on the clothing of princes; these dragon robes were first documented in 694 AD during the reign of Empress Wu Zetian. Common people wore white and soldiers wore black.

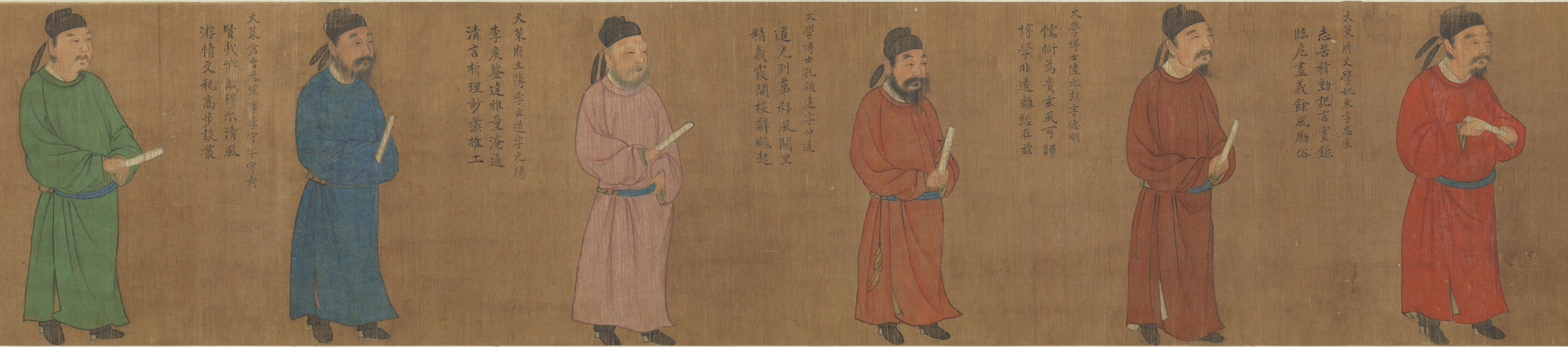
Segment of Yan Liben's painting of scholar-officials wearing futou and yuanlingpao typical of Tang dynasty fashion.
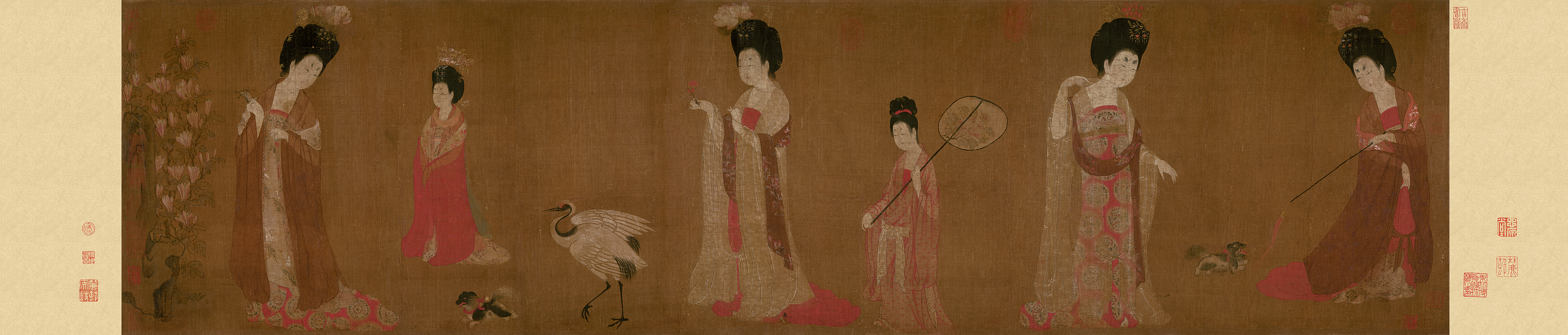
Court Ladies Wearing Flowered Headdresses, 7th century

Common women's attire in the Tang dynasty included shan (衫; a long overcoat or long blouse), ru (襦; a short sweater), banbi, pibo (披帛), and qun (裙; a usually wide, loose skirt which was almost ankle-length). The pibo (披帛), also known as pei (帔) in the Tang dynasty, is a long silk scarf; however it is not used to cover the neck, sometimes it covers the shoulders and other times just hangs from the elbows. Regardless of social status, women in the Tang dynasty tend to be dressed in 3-parts clothing: the upper garment, the skirt, and the pibo (披帛). During the Tang dynasty, there were 4 kinds of waistline for women's skirts: natural waistline; low waistline; high waistline which reached the bust; and, high waistline above the bust, which could create different kind of women's silhouettes and reflected the ideal images of women of this period. This Tang dynasty-style ensemble would reappear several times even after the Tang dynasty, notably during the Ming dynasty and would influence Korean hanbok.

The women's clothing in the early Tang dynasty were quite similar to the clothing in the Sui dynasty; the upper garment was a short-sleeved short jacket with a low-cut; the lower garment was a tight-fitting skirt which was tied generally above the waist, but sometimes as high as the armpits, and a scarf was wrapped around the shoulders. The banbi was commonly worn on top of a plain top and was worn together with high-waisted, striped or one-colour A-line skirt in the seventh century. Red coloured skirts were very popular during the Tang dynasty.

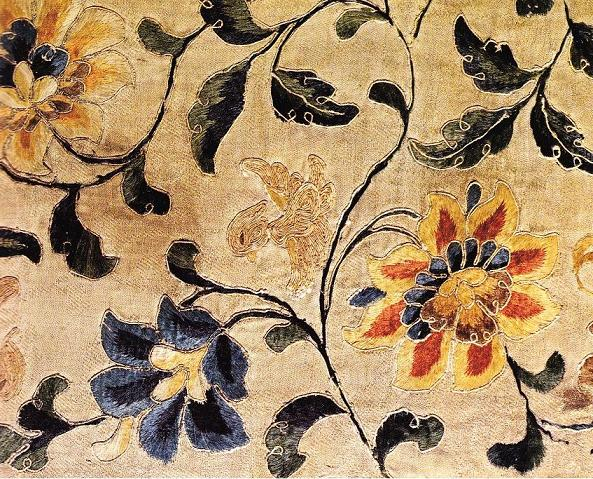
Early Tang embroidery, from Mogao caves.

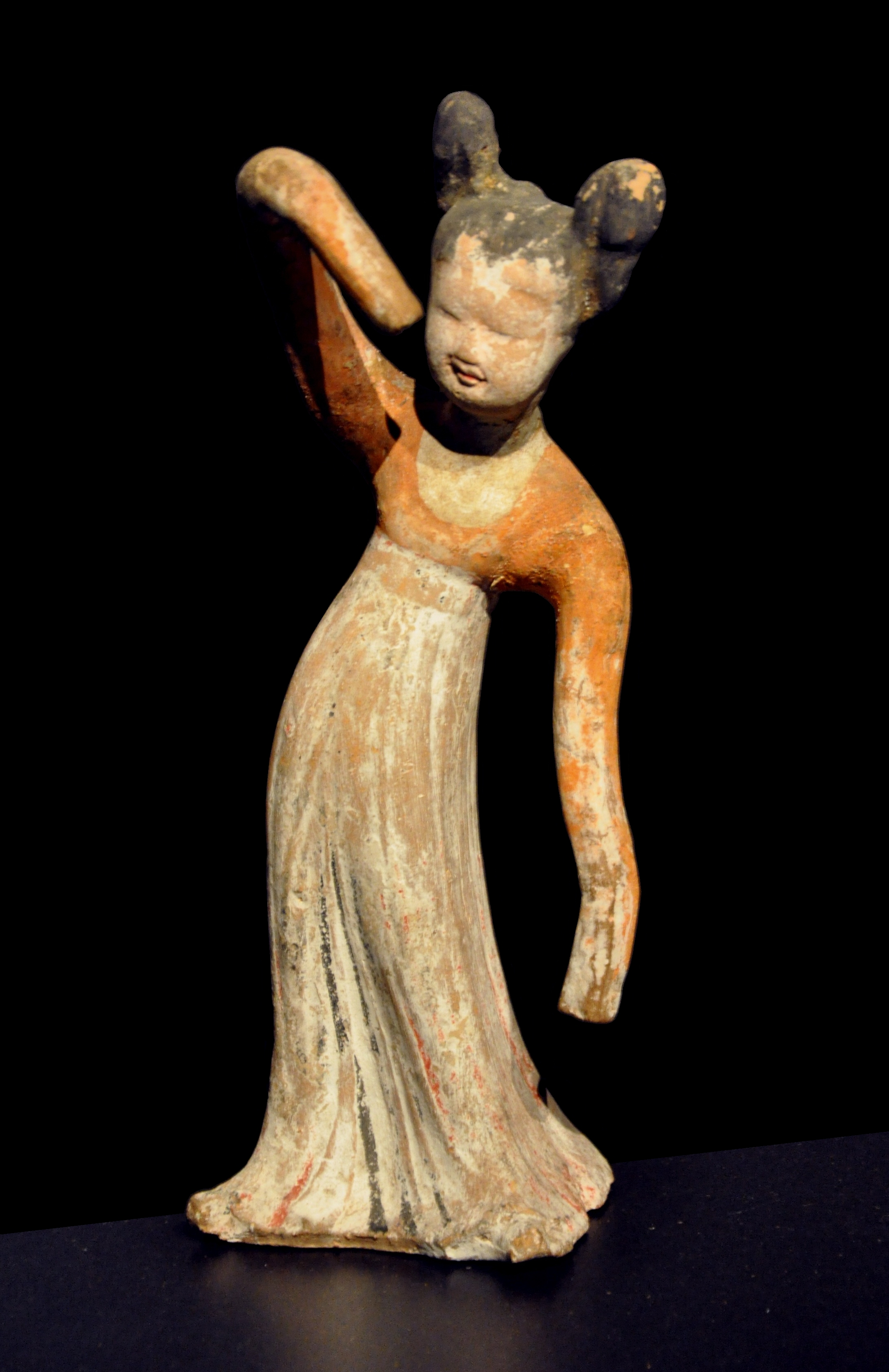
Female dancer wearing a tanling ruqun, early Tang, 7th century AD.

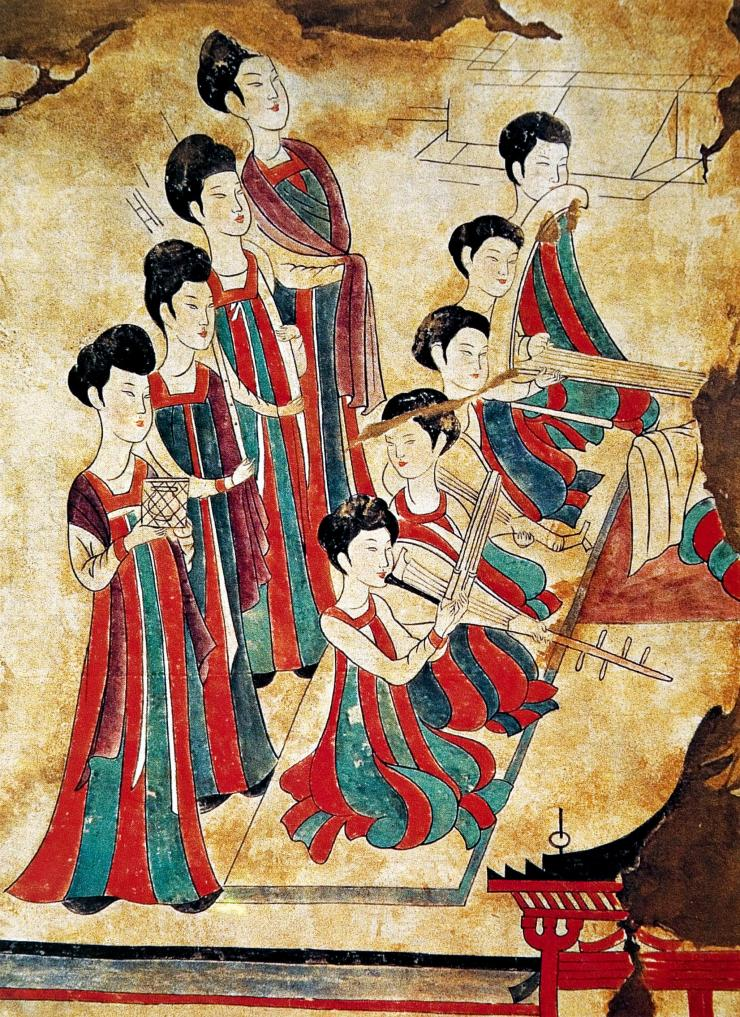
A Group of Tang Dynasty Musicians from the Tomb of Li Shou (李壽) (577-630 AD), early Tang dynasty.

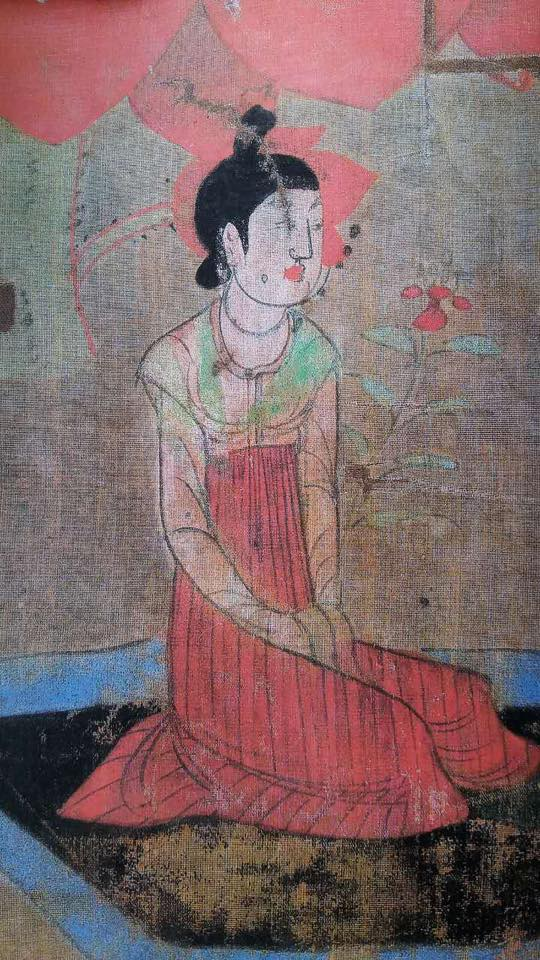
A Tang Dynasty Woman with Flower, dressed in ruqun.

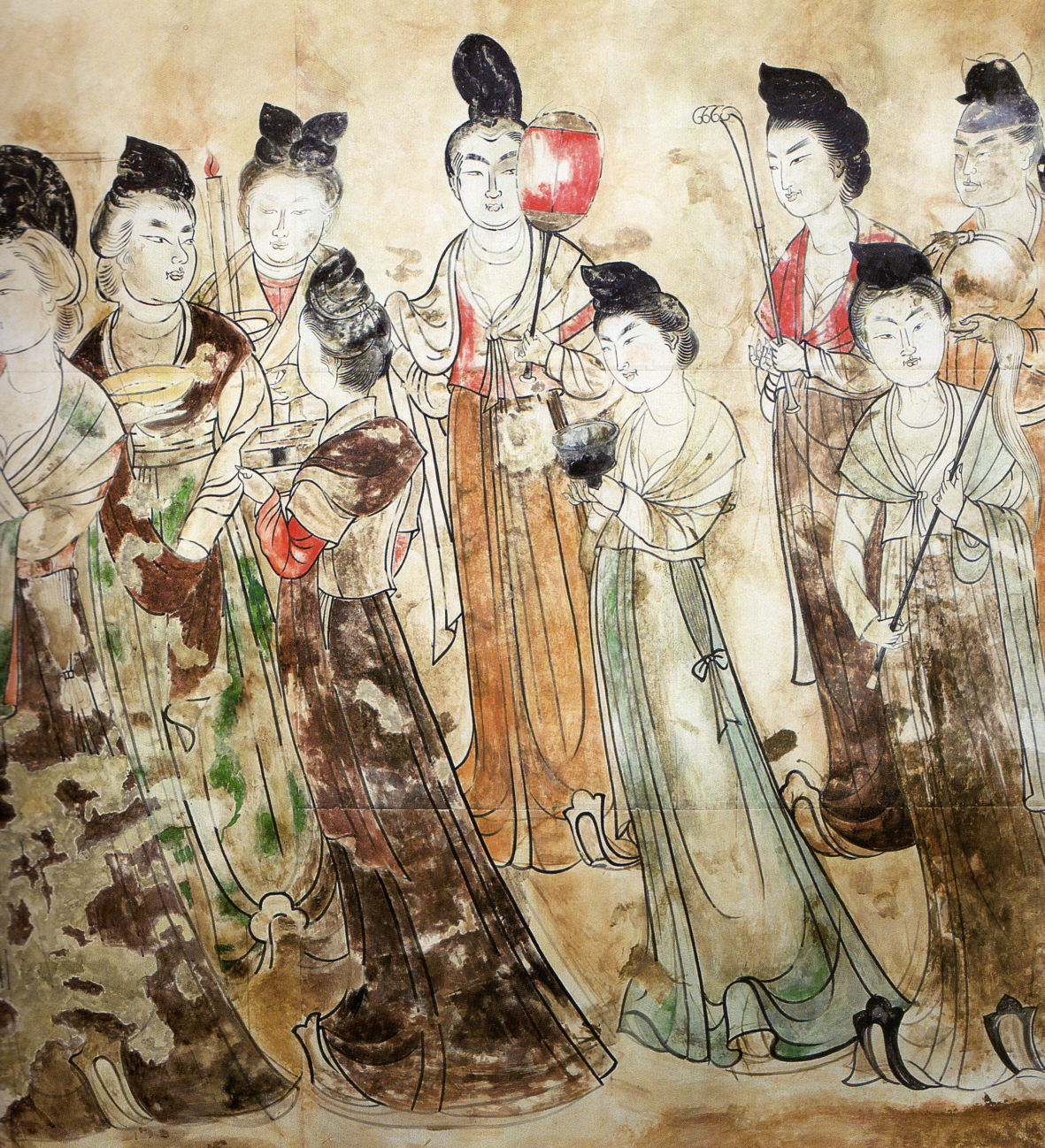
Court ladies of the Tang from Li Xianhui's tomb, Qianling Mausoleum, dated 706.

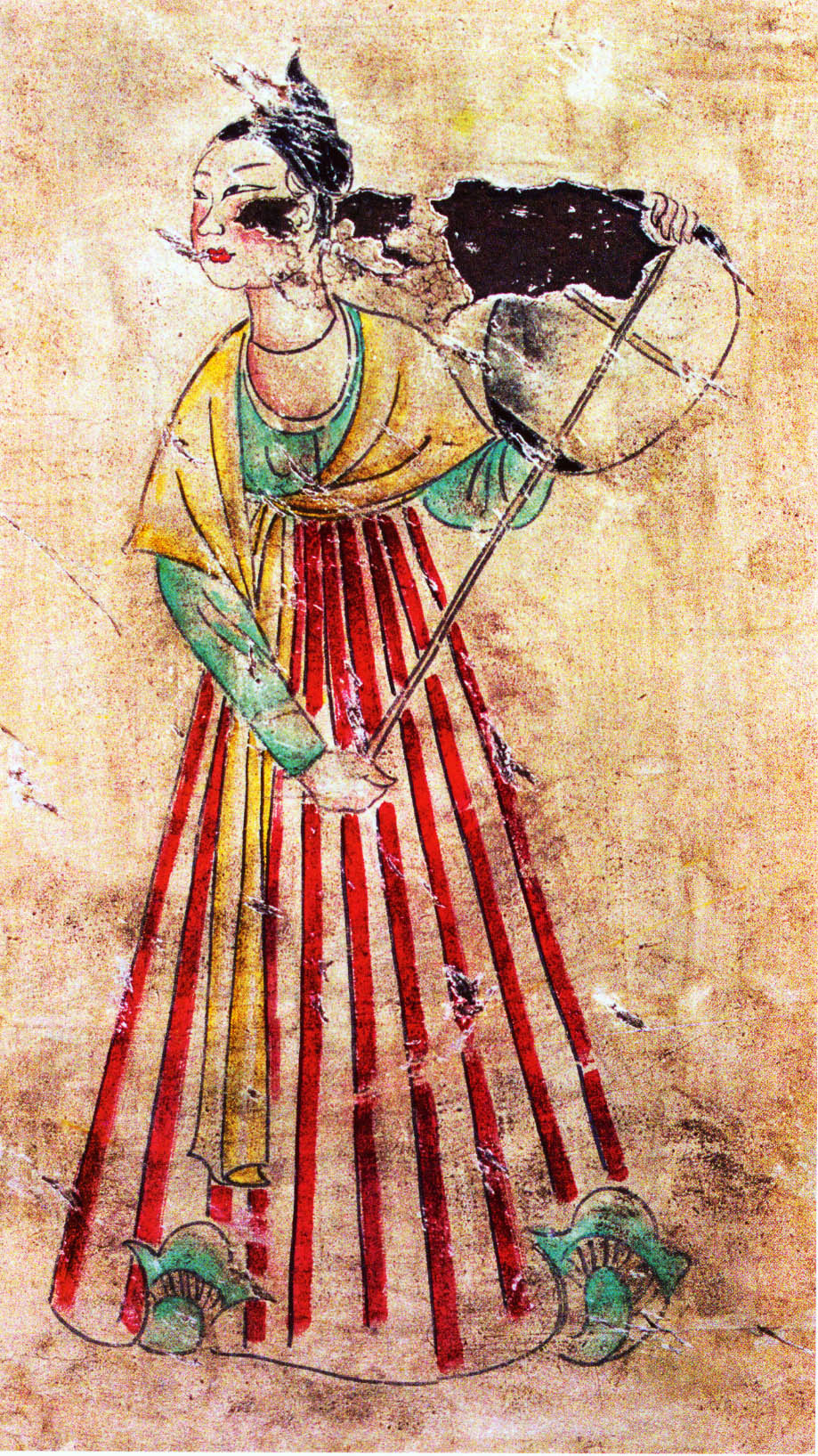
A Young Girl, Fresco from the Tomb of An Yüen-shou (安元壽) (607-683 A.D.), early Tang dynasty.

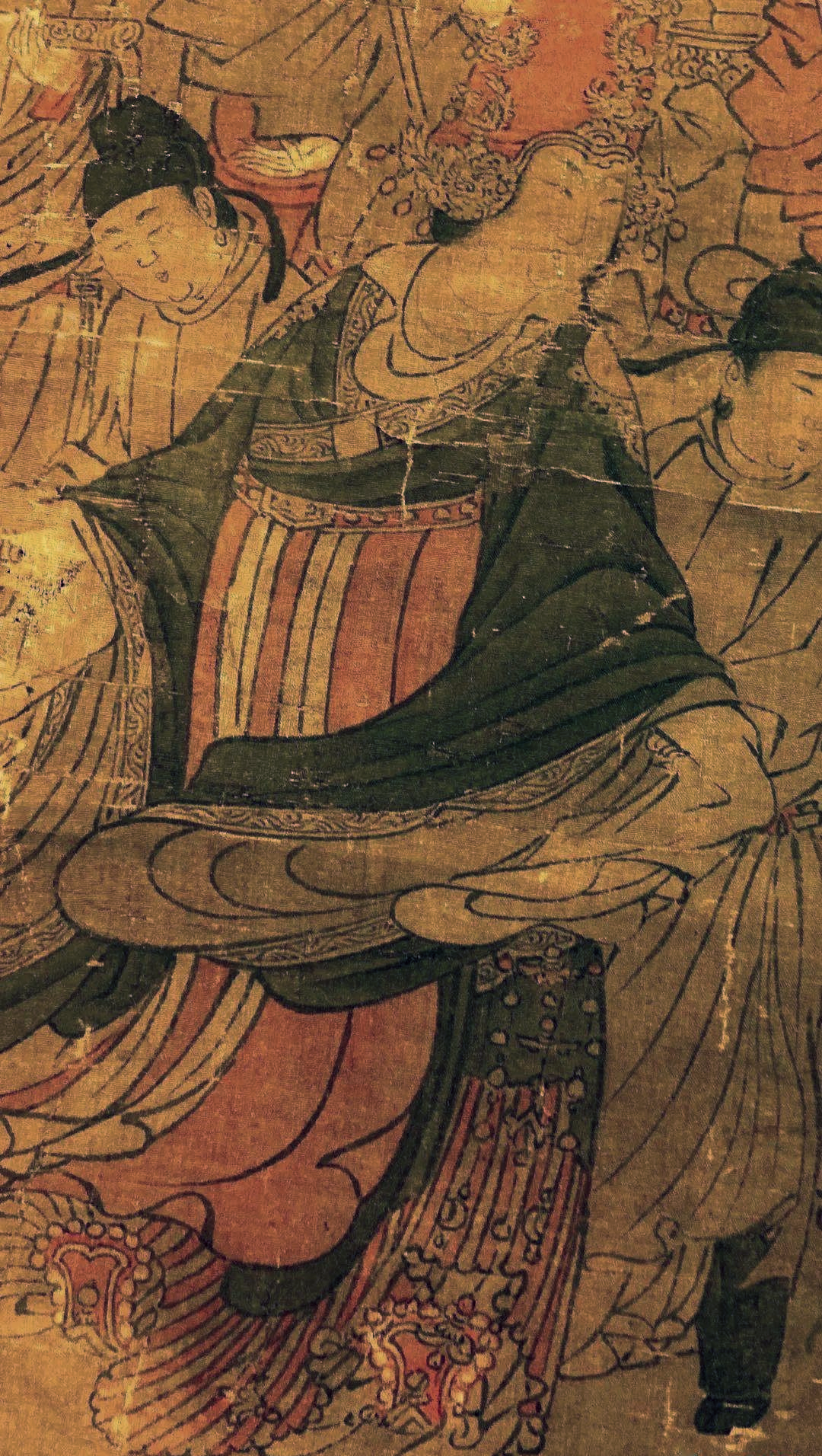
Wu Zetian depicted on Tang Empress' Travel-painting.
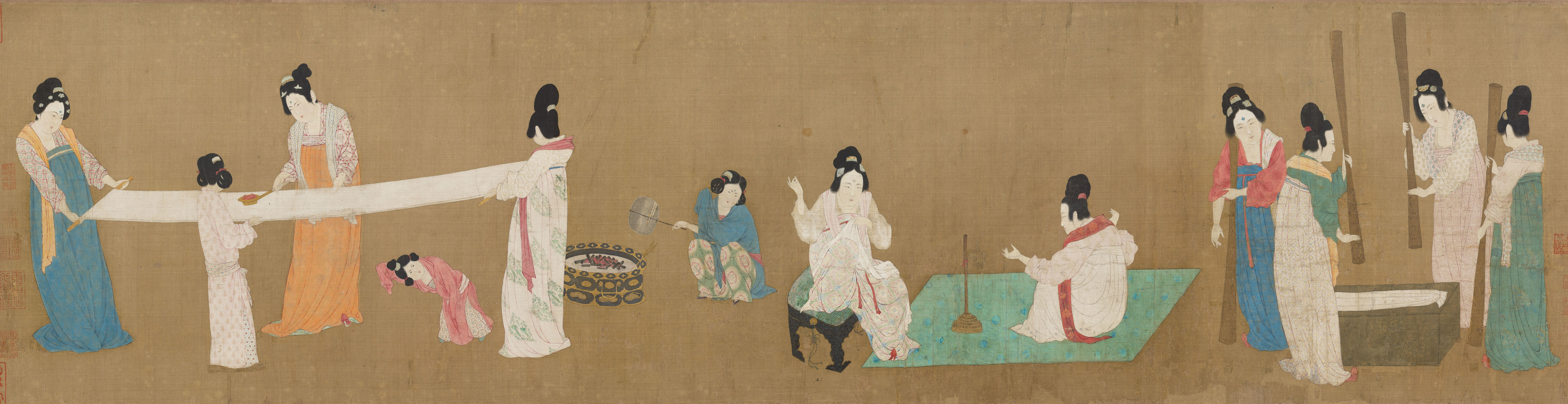
8th Century Court Ladies Preparing Silk

In the middle of the Tang dynasty, women who had a plump appearance were favoured; thus, the clothing became looser, the sleeves became longer and wider, the upper garment became strapless, and a silk unlined upper garment was worn; they wore "breast dresses". This change in the ideal corporal shape of women's bodies has been attributed to a beloved consort of Emperor Xuanzong of Tang, called Yang Guifei, although archeological evidence shows that this ideal of the female body had emerged before Yang Guifei's ascension to power in the imperial court.

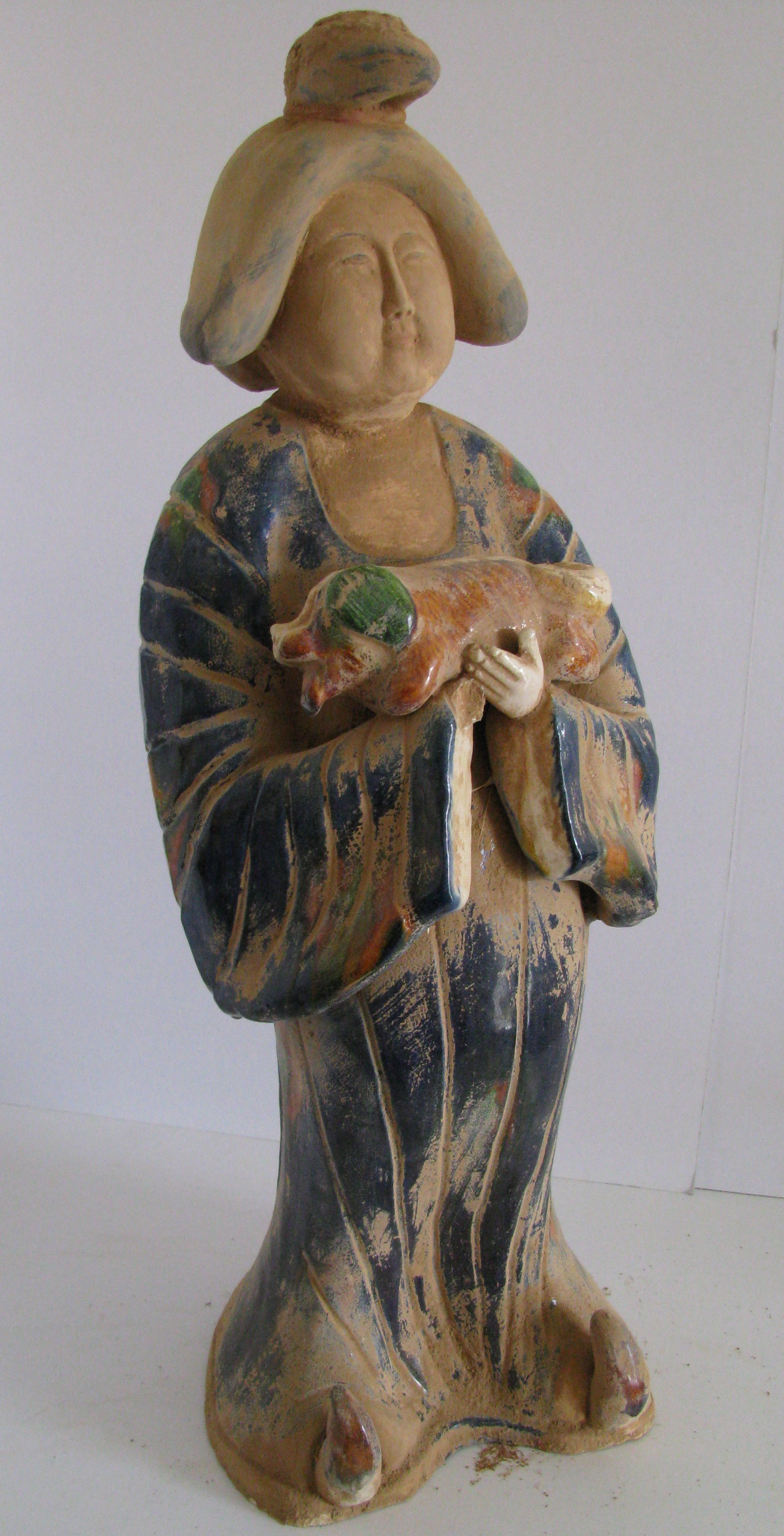
A sancai figurine of a plump lady holding a Dog, Tang dynasty.

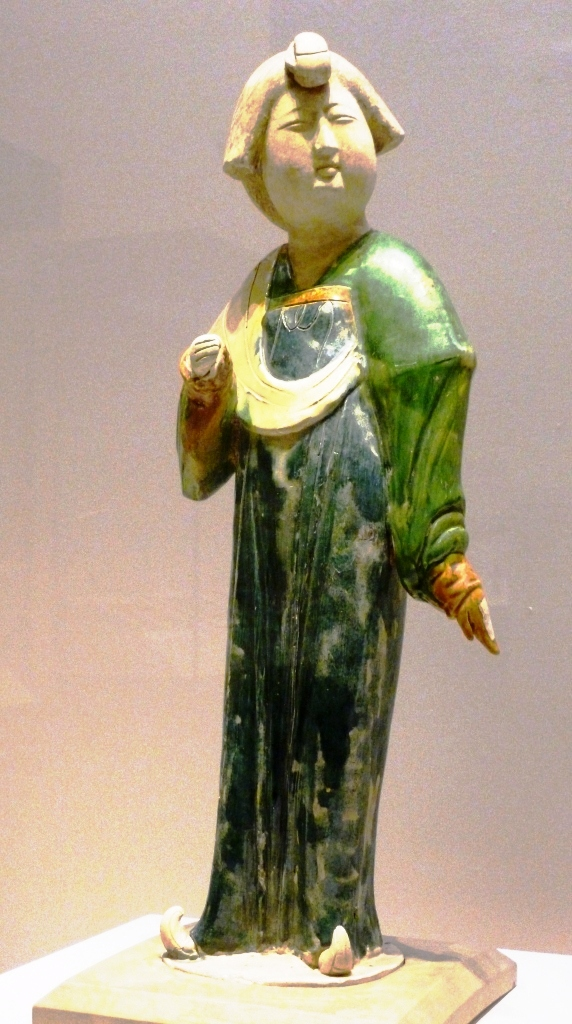
Sancai glazed female figurine Tang dynasty 618–907.

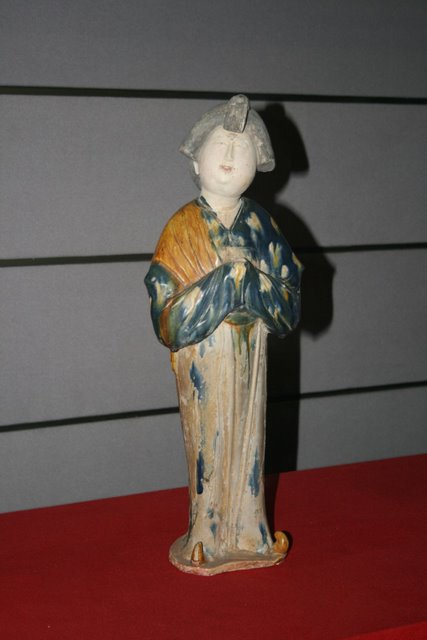
Tang Dynasty, sancai pottery, woman figurine.

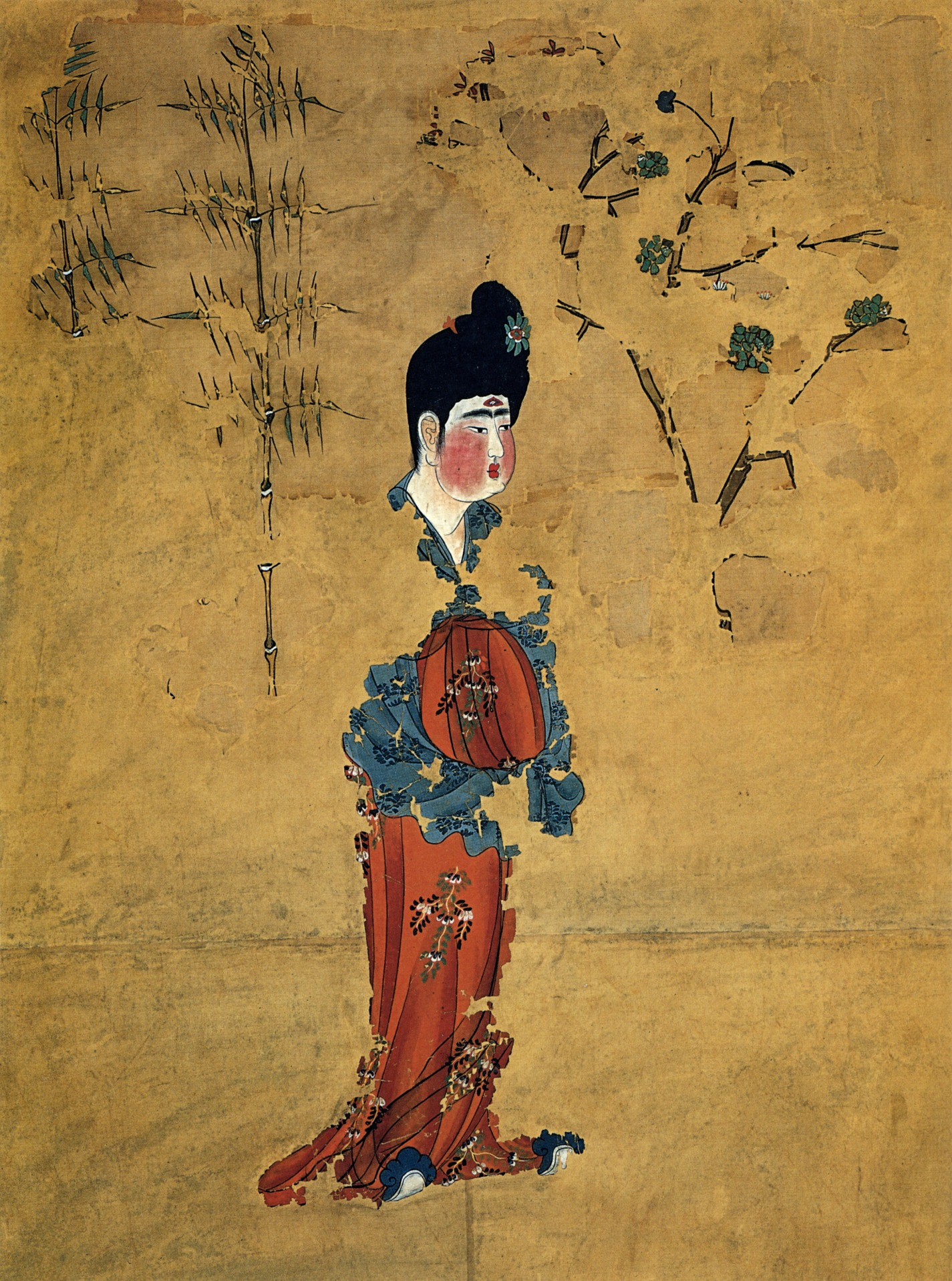
Anonymous-Astana Graves Courtesan, c. 744, Tang dynasty.

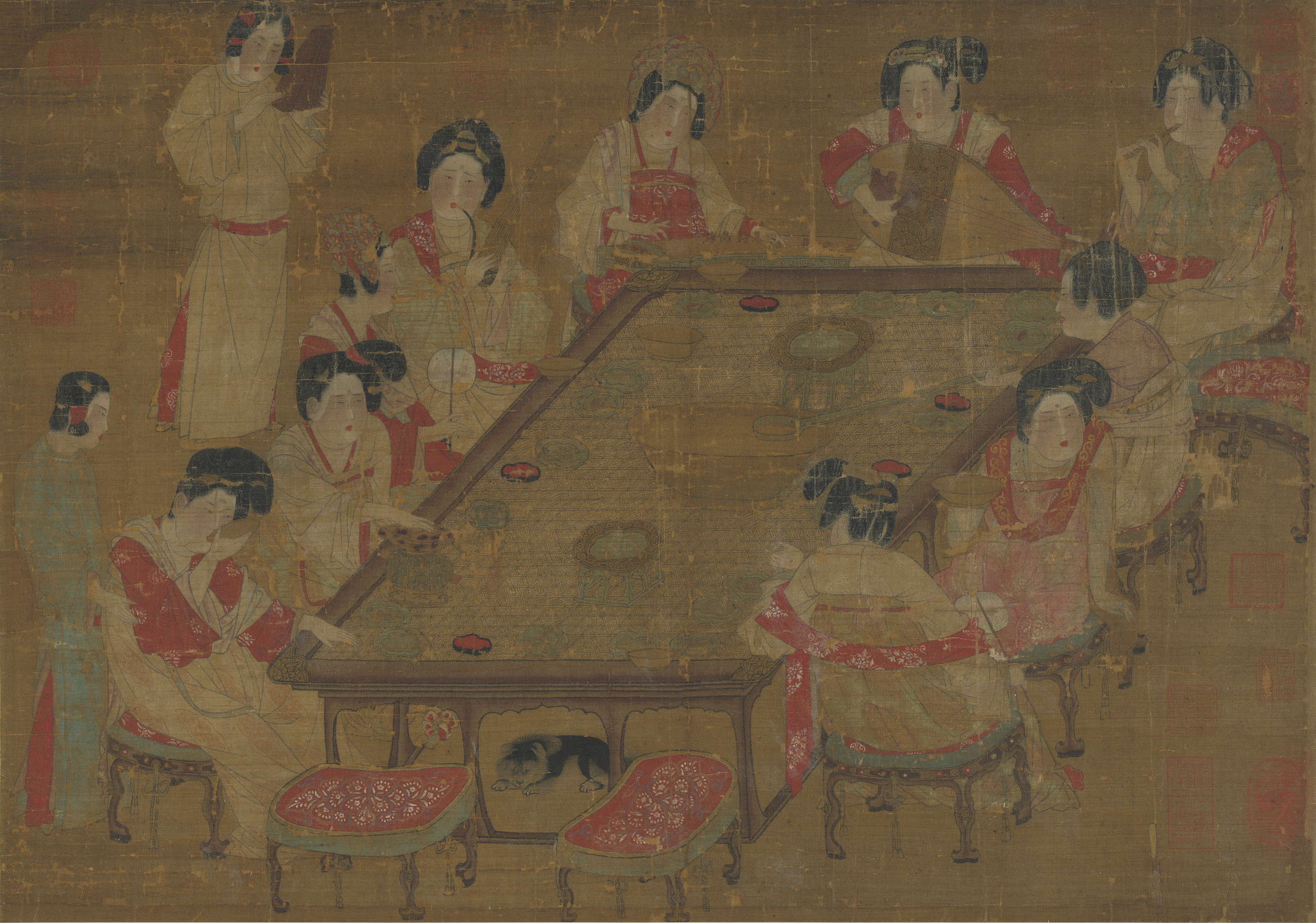
Women wearing qixiong ruqun, Painting of "A palace concert", Tang dynasty, c.836 – 907.
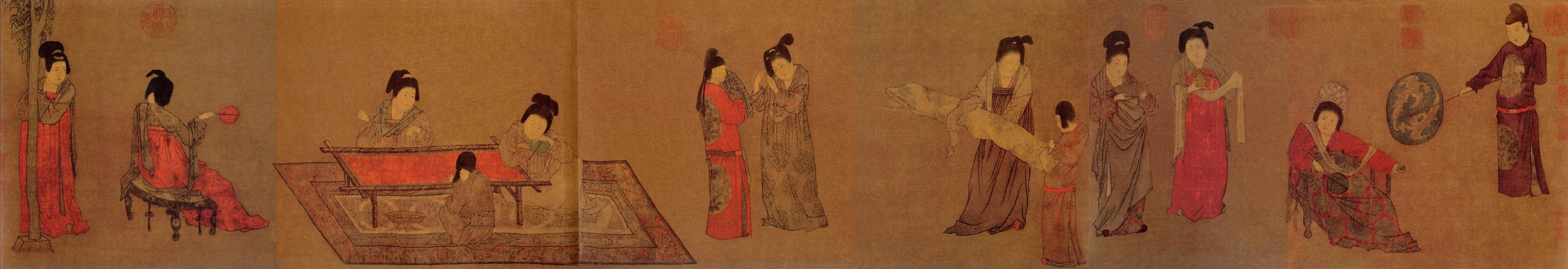
Lady with Servants attributed to Zhou Fang, 8th century CE.

Another form of popular fashion in women's attire during the Tang dynasty was the wearing of male clothing; it was fashionable for women to dress in male attire in public and in everyday life, especially during the Kaiyuan and Tianbao (742–756 AD) periods; this fashion started among the members of the nobility and the court maids and gradually spread in the community. Men's attire during the Tang dynasty usually included robes which was worn with trousers, yuanlingpao, belt worn at the waist, futou, and dark leather boots. The Tang dynasty inherited all the forms of belts which were worn in the Wei, Jin, Northern and Southern dynasties and adopted them in the official costumes of the military and civil officials. In some instances, however, Han Chinese-style robes continued to be depicted in art showing court officials. In the Tang dynasty, the yuanlingpao was worn by both men and women.

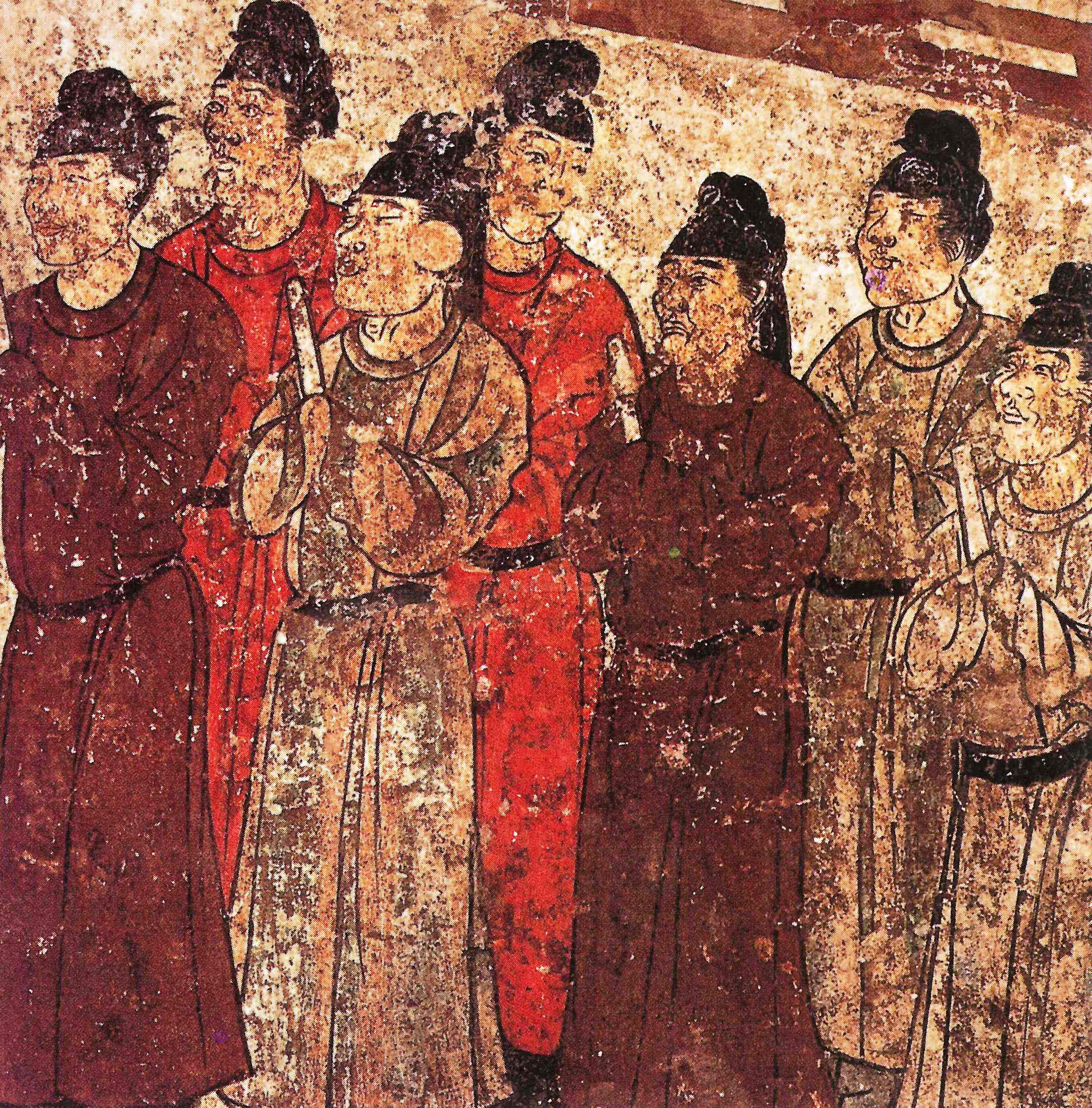
A group of eunuchs, Prince Zhanghuai's tomb, Tang dynasty, 706 AD.

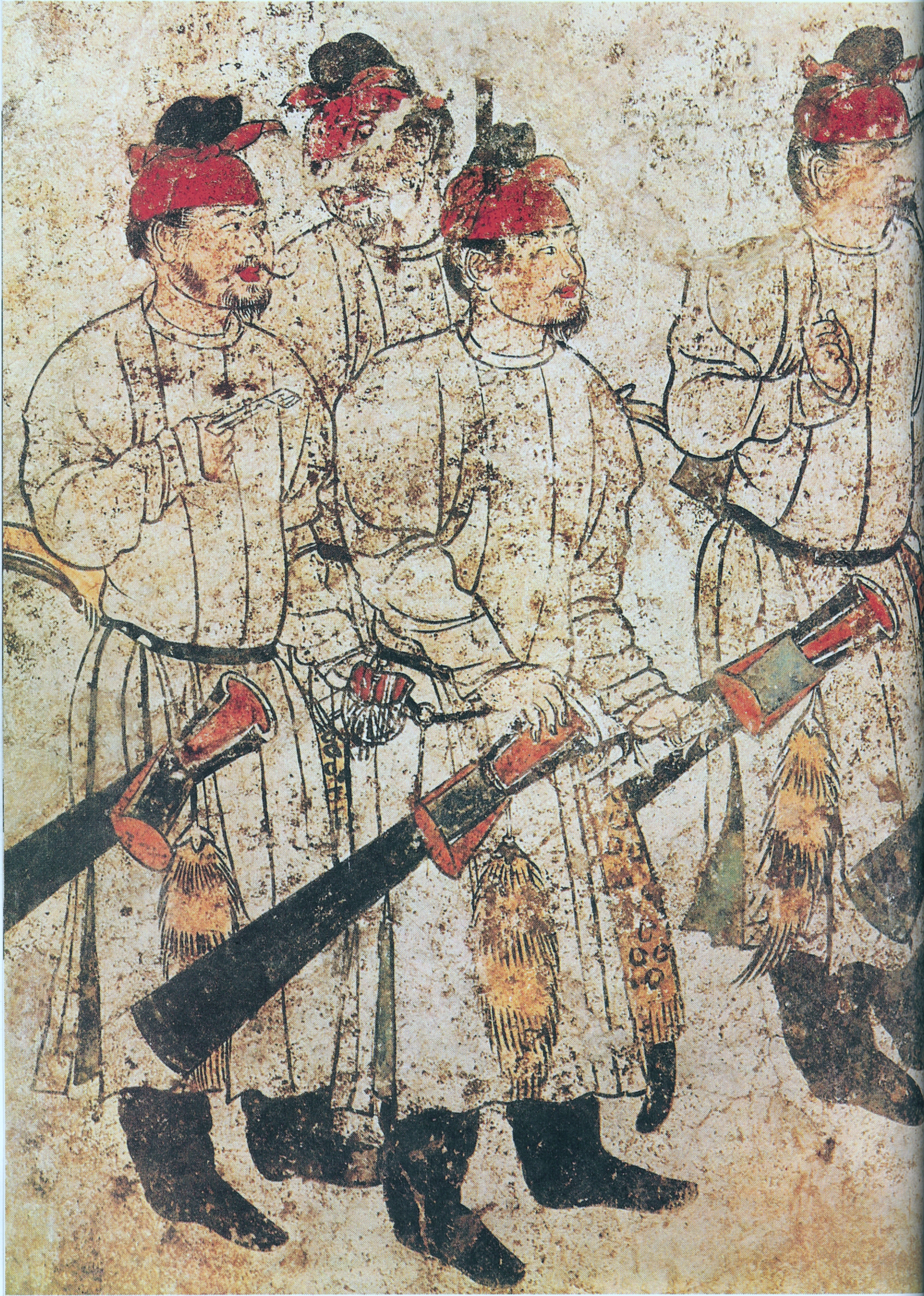
Figures in a cortege wearing round-collar robe, from a wall mural in the Tang dynasty Chinese tomb of Li Xian, 706 AD.

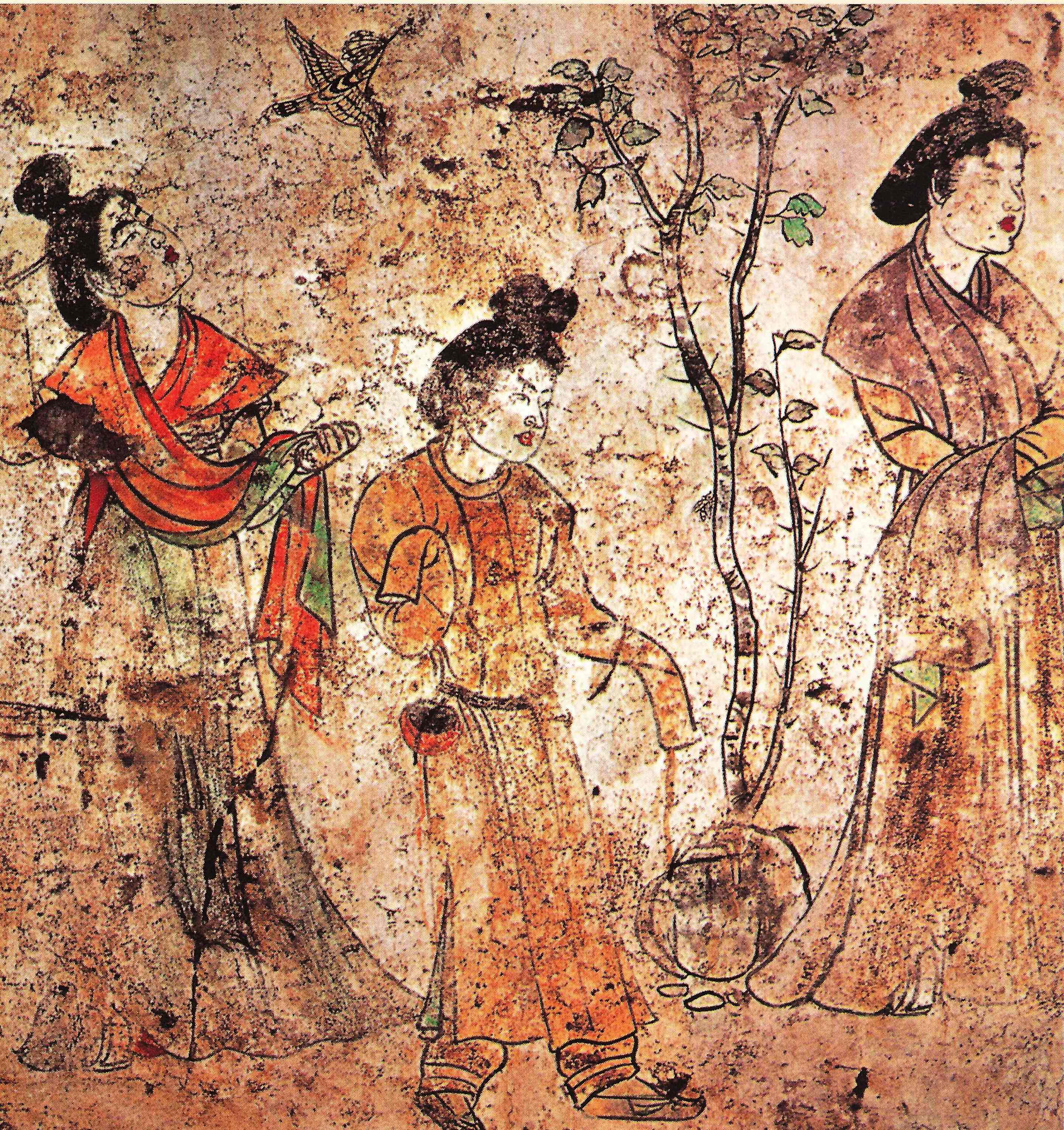
Palace ladies; from Li Xian's tomb, Tang dynasty, 706 AD. The girl in the middle is wearing a yuanlingpao.

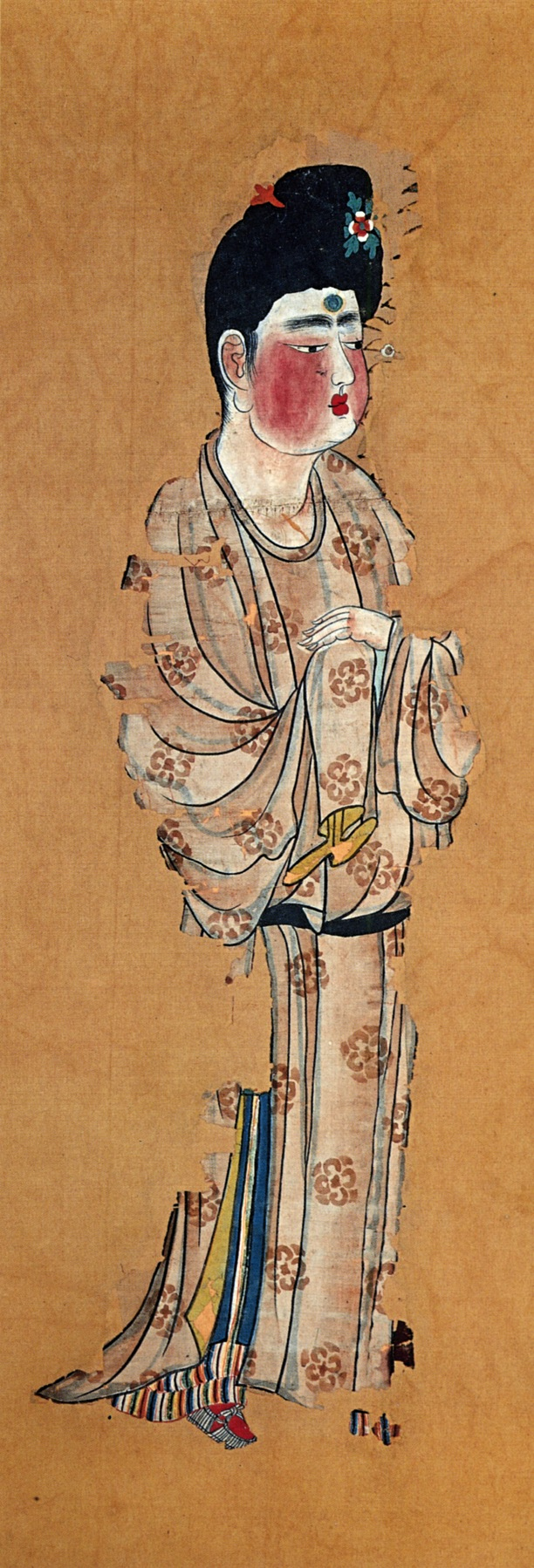
Female servant in Tang dynasty dressed in a yuanlingpao; mid 8th century AD.

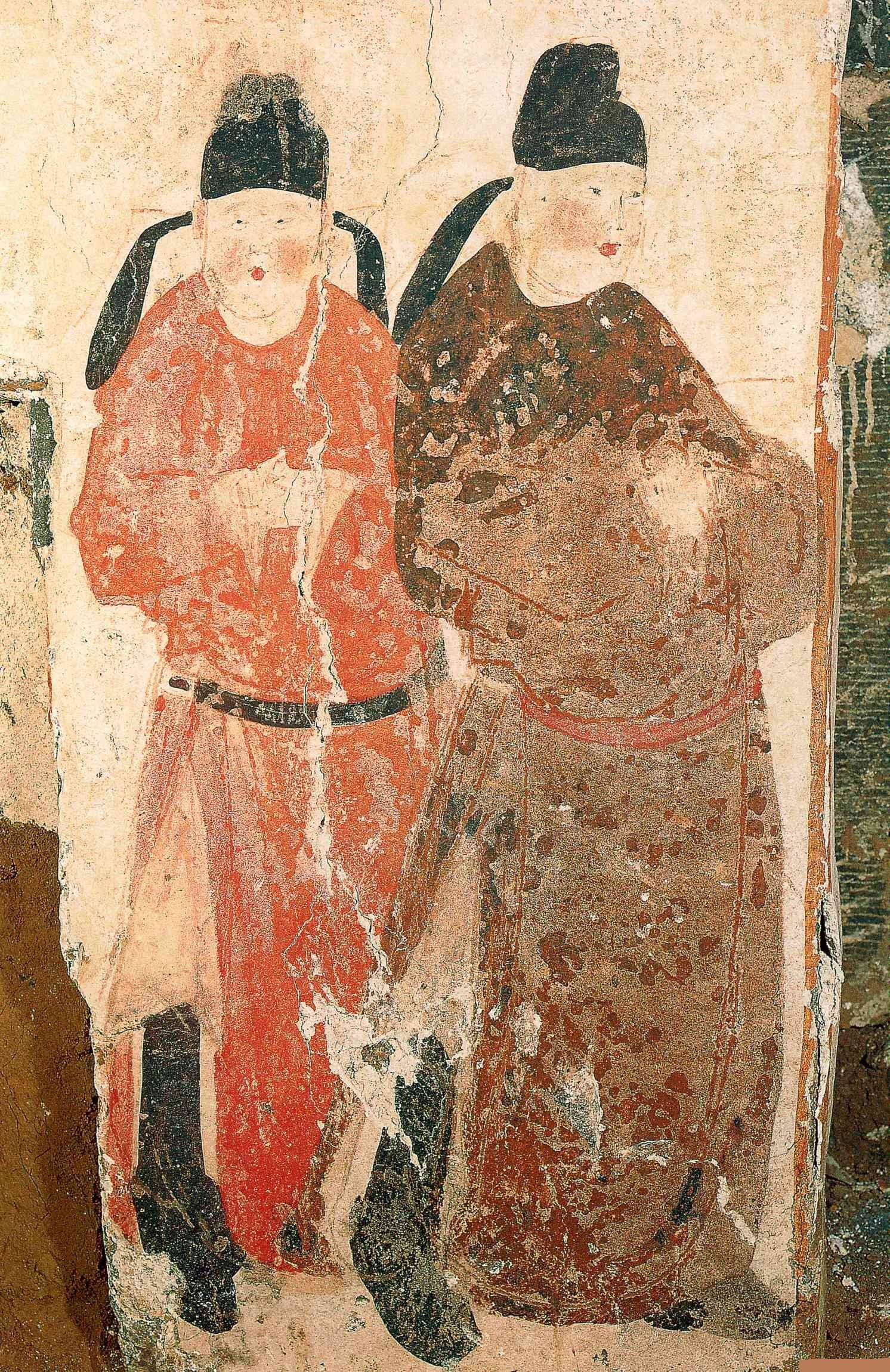
Men wearing round collar gowns with boots, belt, trousers; Mural painting from the Tomb of Wang Chuzhi, Five Dynasties and Ten Kingdoms period.

The shoes worn by Han Chinese were lü (履), xi (shoes with thick soles), women's boots, and ji (屐; wooden clogs) with two spikes were worn when walking outside on muddy roads; in the South, xueji (靴屐; a type of boot-like clog) was developed. Some shoes were commonly curved in the front and were phoenix-shaped.

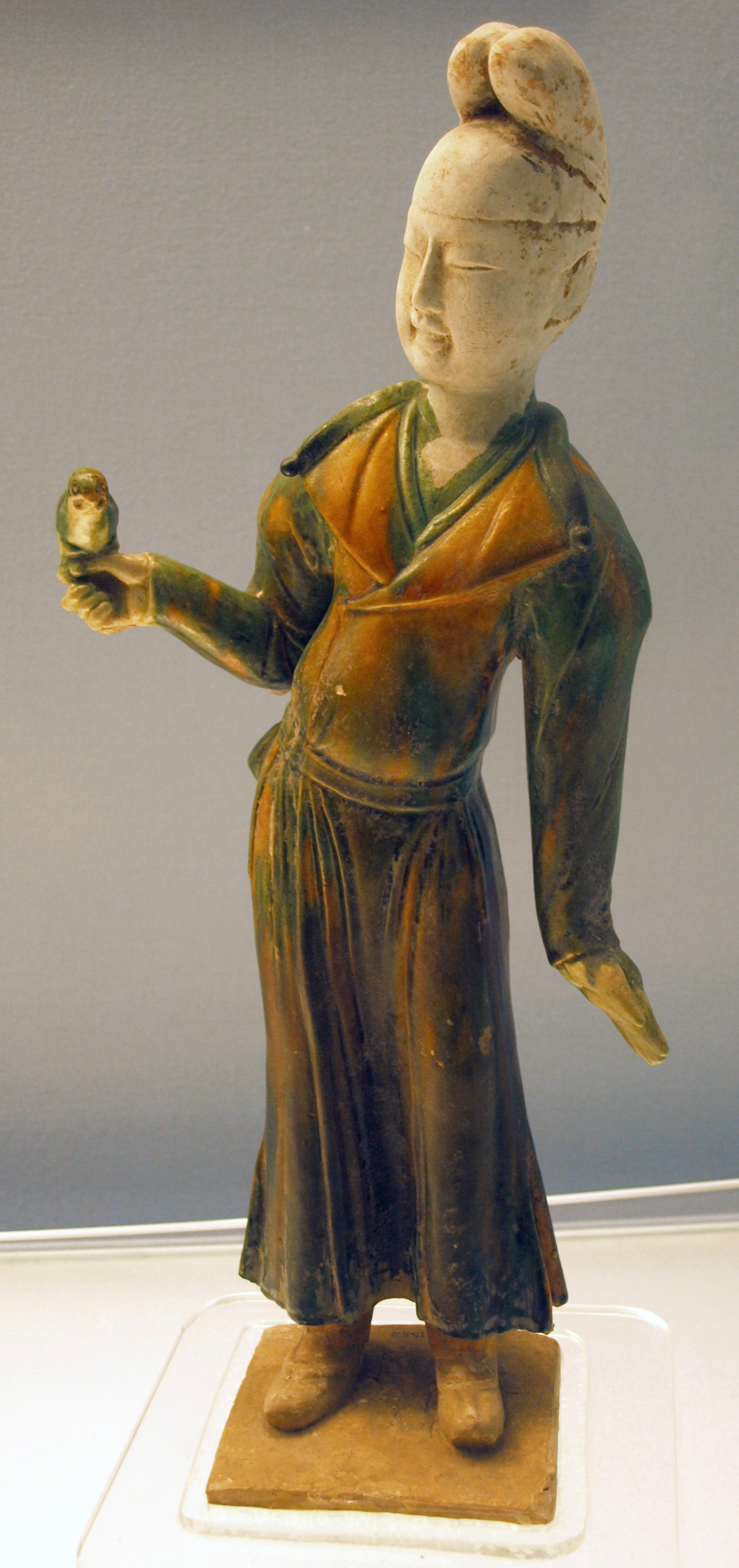
Woman wearing fanlingpao, Tang dynasty.

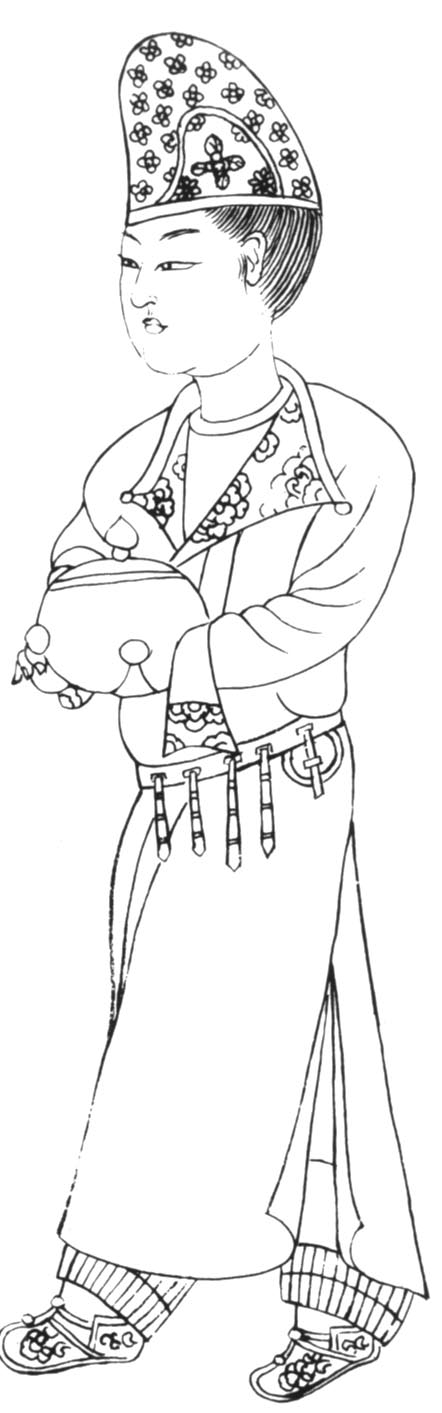
Woman wearing kuapao-style hufu, Tang dynasty.

The Tang dynasty represents a golden age in China's history, when the arts, sciences and economy were thriving. Female dress and personal adornments in particular reflected the new visions of this era, which saw unprecedented trade and interaction with cultures and philosophies alien to Chinese borders. Although it still continues the clothing of its predecessors such as Han and Sui dynasties, fashion during the Tang dynasty was also influenced by its cosmopolitan culture and art. Where previously Chinese women had been restricted by the old Confucian code to closely wrapped, concealing outfits, female dress in the Tang dynasty gradually became more relaxed, less constricting and even more revealing. The Tang dynasty also saw the ready acceptance, and syncretisation with Chinese practices, of elements of foreign culture by the Han Chinese. The foreign influences prevalent during Tang China included cultures from Gandhara, Turkestan, Persia and Greece. The stylistic influences of these cultures were fused into Tang-style clothing without any one particular culture having special prominence.

An example of foreign influence on Tang women's clothing is the use of garments with a low-cut neckline. Women were also allowed to fashion themselves in hufu. (Note: Hufu in the Tang dynasty included clothing styles from the Tartars or clothing of the people who lived in the Western Regions during this period.) Popular menswear such as Persian-style round collared robes with tight sleeves and a central band decorated with flowers on the front was also popular among the Tang dynasty's women; this Persian-style round collared robe is different from the local worn yuanlingpao. Long Persian trousers and knickers were also worn by women as a result of the cultural and economic exchanges which took place. Striped trousers were also worn. The Chinese trousers during this period were narrow compared to the dashao and the dakouku which were worn in the preceding dynasties. In the 7th and 8th centuries, the kuapao, which originated from Central Asia could be worn by men and were also used as main garment for cross-dressing attendants or could be draped across the shoulders like a cloak. The headwear of women during the Tang dynasty also demonstrates evidence of foreign clothing inclusion in their attire. In the Taizong era, women wore a burqa-like mili which concealed the entire body when horse back riding; the trend changed to the use of weimao during the reign of Emperor Gaozong of Tang and Wu Zetian; and after that, during the early reign of Emperor Xuanzong of Tang, women started wearing a veil-less hat called humao; women eventually stopped wearing hats when horse riding, and by the 750's, women dressing in men's garments became popular. Noble women of the Tang dynasty wore the veil, and after the Yonghui reign the veil with hat was worn. After the mid-seventh century, the social expectation that women had to hide their faces in public disappeared.

It was also fashionable for noble women to wear Huihuzhuang after the An Lushan Rebellion. Another trend which emerged after the An Lushan Rebellion is the sad and depressed-look while looking exquisite which reflected the instability of the political situation in this period. Of note, just like women in the Tang dynasty period incorporated Central Asian-styles in their clothing, Central Asian women were also wearing some Hanfu-style clothing from the Tang dynasty and/or would combine elements of the Han Chinese-style attire and ornamental aesthetic in their ethnic attire. In 840 AD, the Uyghur empire collapsed, the Uyghur refugees fled to Xinjiang and to the Southeast of Tang frontier to seek refuge, and in 843 AD, all the Uighur living in China had to wear Chinese-style clothing.

The influence of hufu eventually faded after the High Tang period, and women's clothing gradually regained a broad, loose fitting, and more traditional Han style. The sleeve width of garments for ordinary women was more than 1.3 meters. The daxiushan, for example, was made of an almost transparent, thin silk; it featured beautiful designs and patterns and its sleeves were so broad that it was more than 1.3 meters. Based on the painting, "Court ladies adorning their hair with flowers" (簪花仕女圖; Zanhua shinü tu), a painting attributed to the painter Zhou Fang, women's clothing was depicted as a sleeveless gown which was worn under a robe with wide sleeves, with the use of a shawl as an ornament; some of the women painted are fashioned with skirts while others are seen wearing an overskirt above an underskirt; it is speculated that shawls and cloaks during this period were made from a silk-netted sheer gauze fabric material.

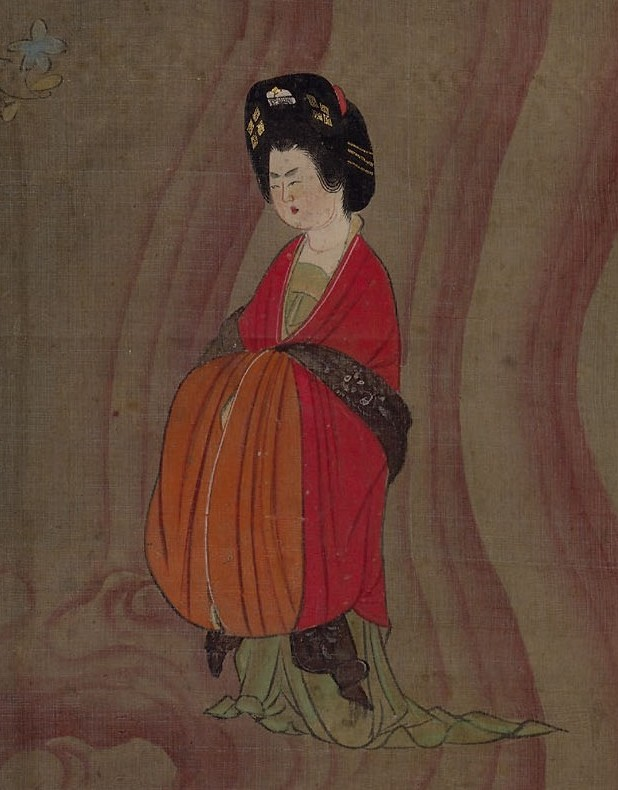
Tang dynasty noblewoman

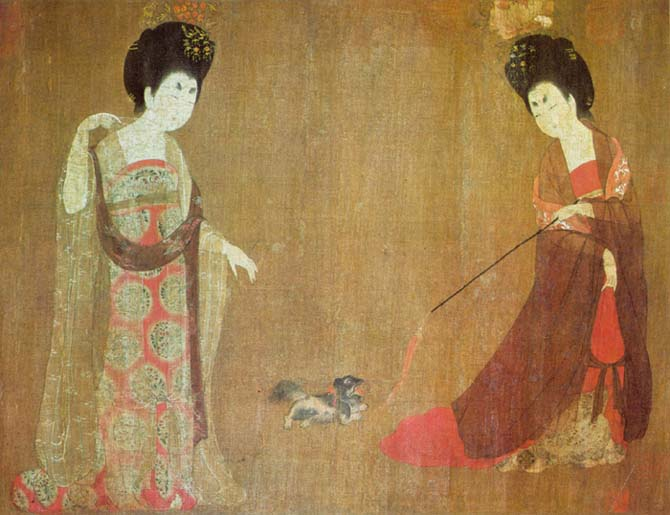
A painting of Tang dynasty women playing with a dog, by artist Zhou Fang, 8th century.

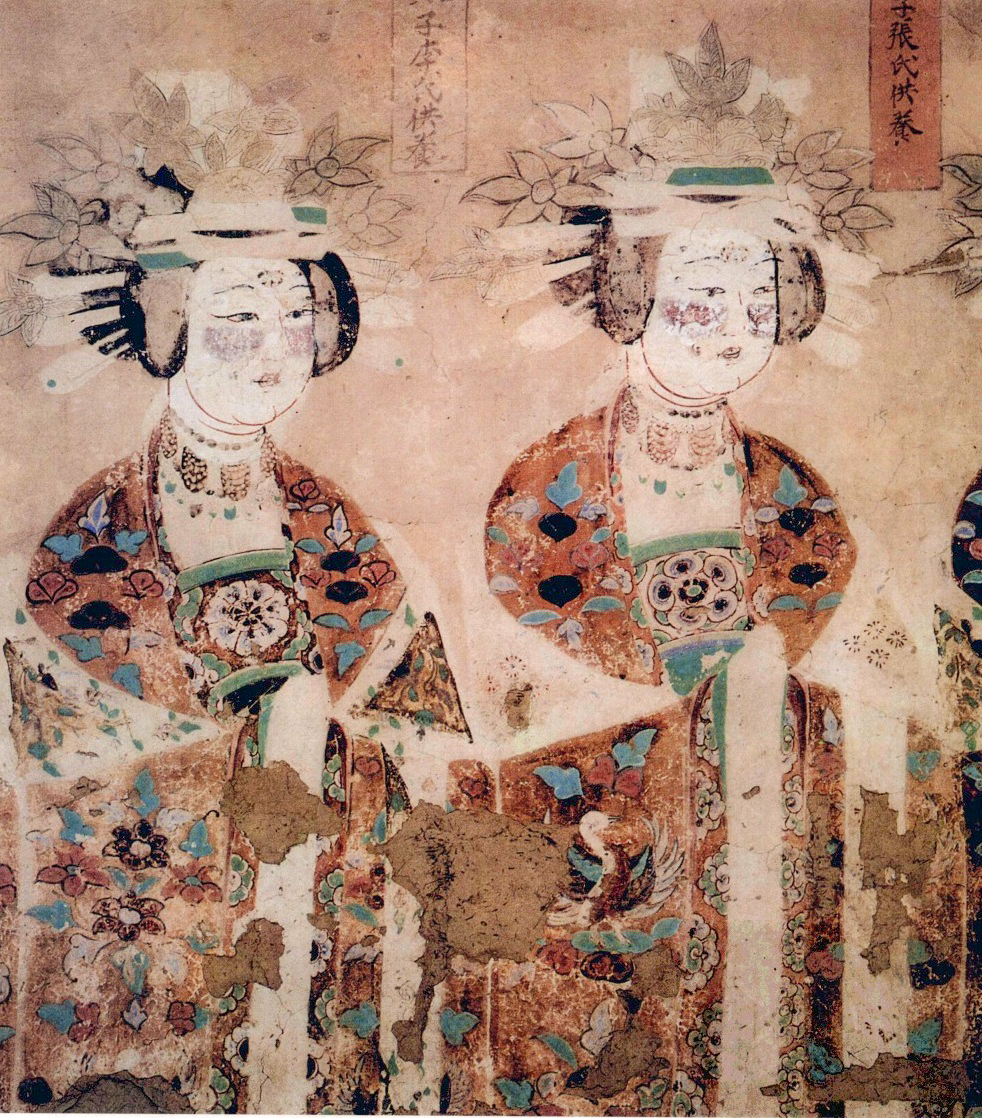
Buddhist donors

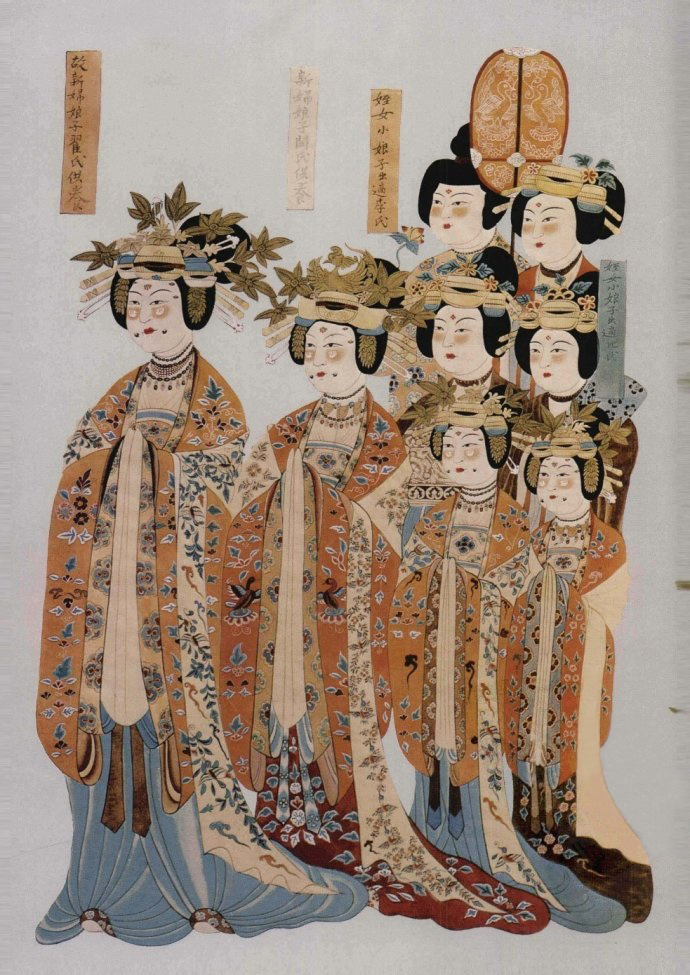
Buddhist donors of late Tang dynasty.

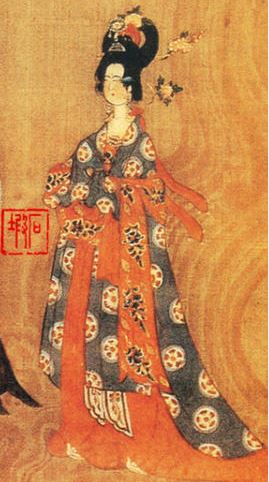
A noble lady from the painting Bodhisattva Who Leads the Way, Five Dynasties and Ten Kingdoms.

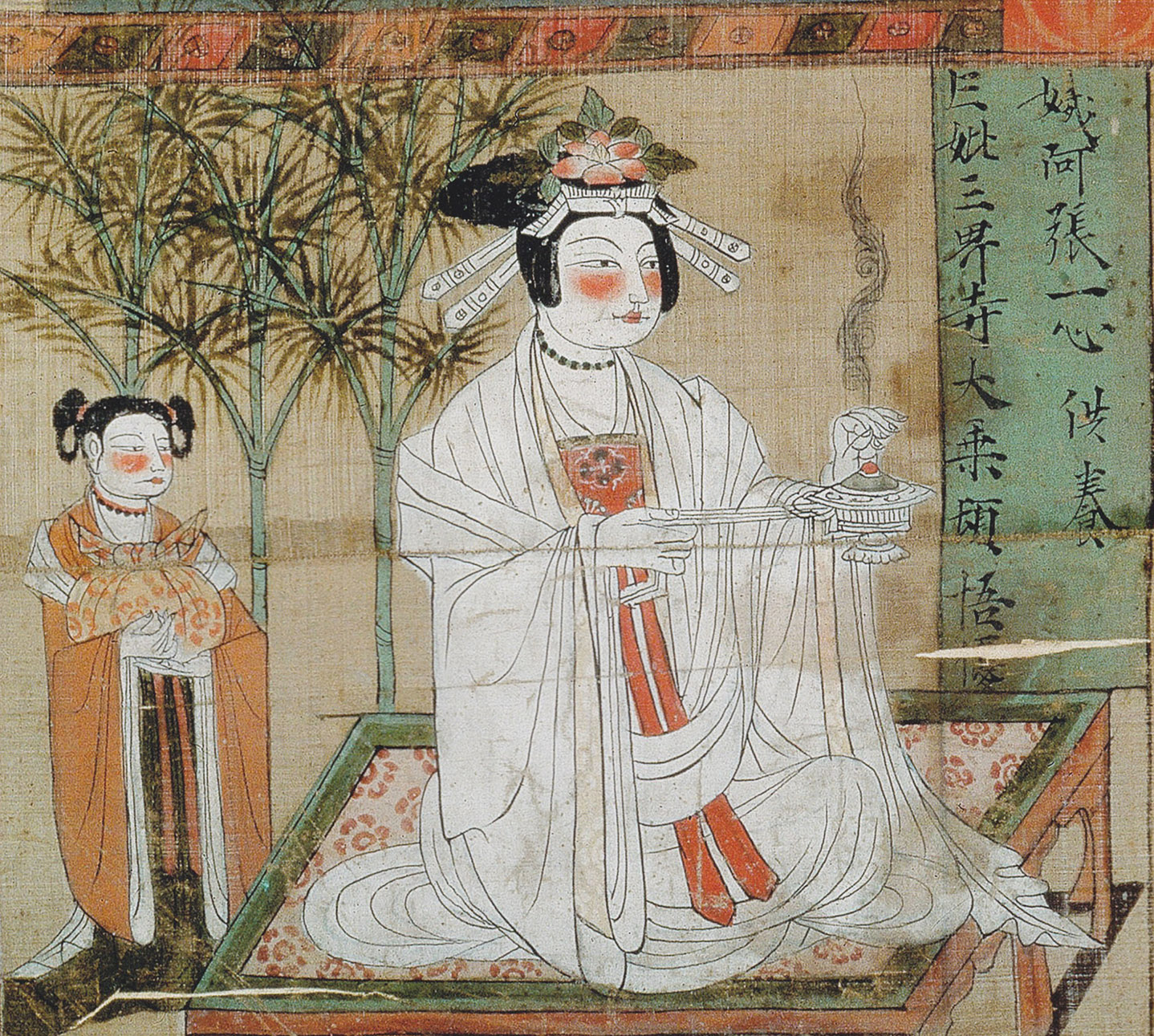
Buddhist donatress Chang, Five Dynasties and Ten Kingdoms.

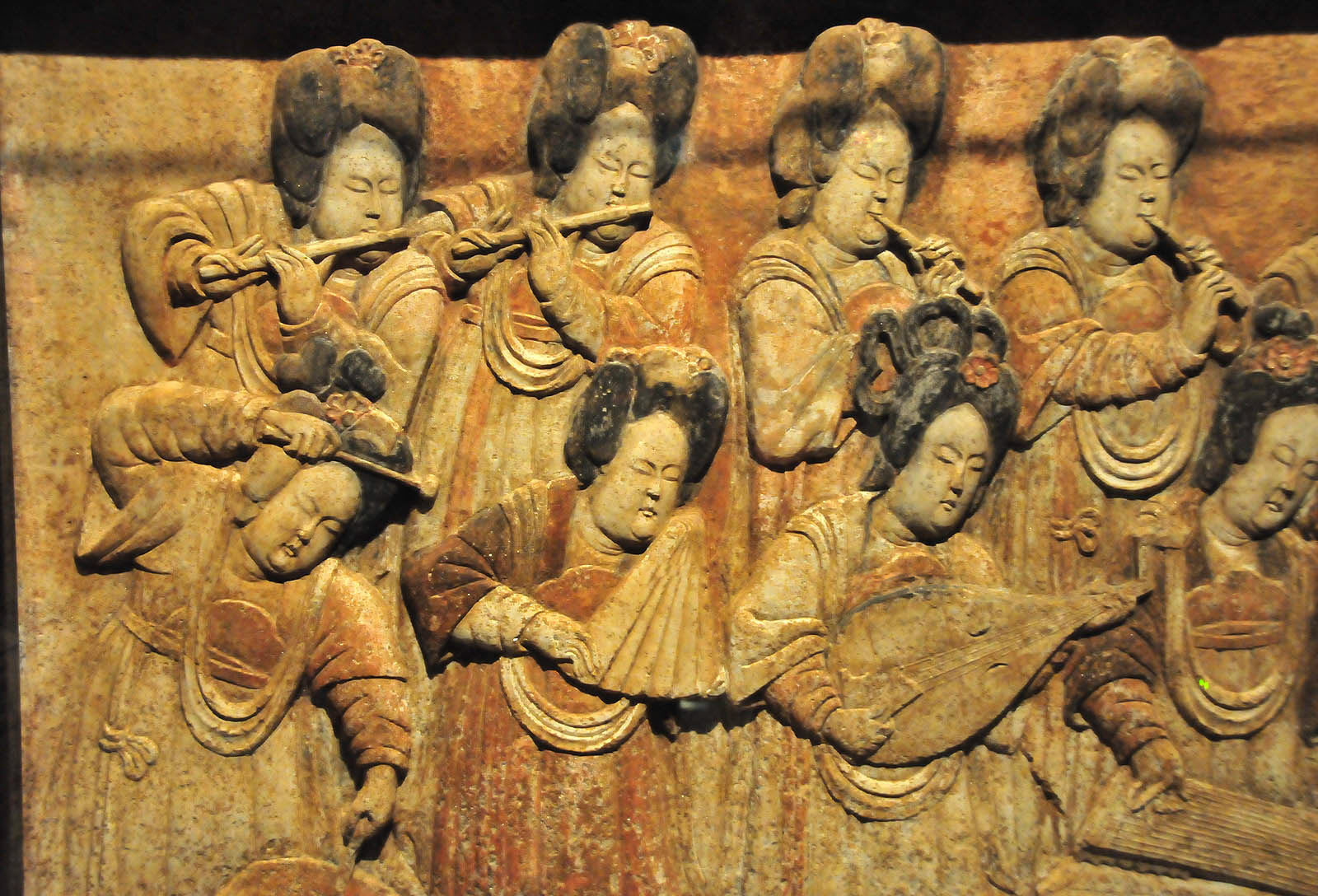
Lady musicians in a raised-relief, Tomb of Wang Chuzhi (d. 923AD) from the Capital Museum in Beijing, dated to the Five Dynasties and the Ten Kingdoms Period (907-960 AD).

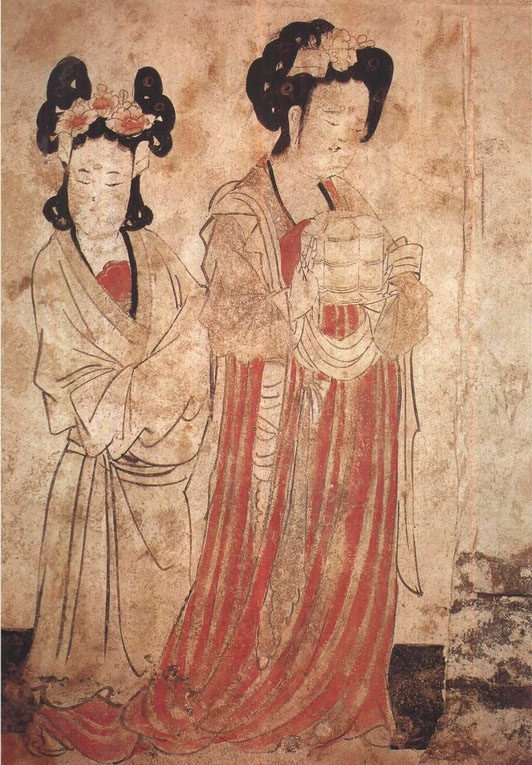
Mural of Wang Chuzhi tomb, Southern Tang.

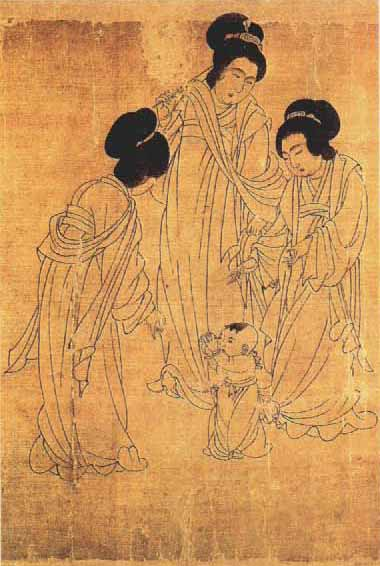
Women of Southern Tang holding a baby, 10th century AD.

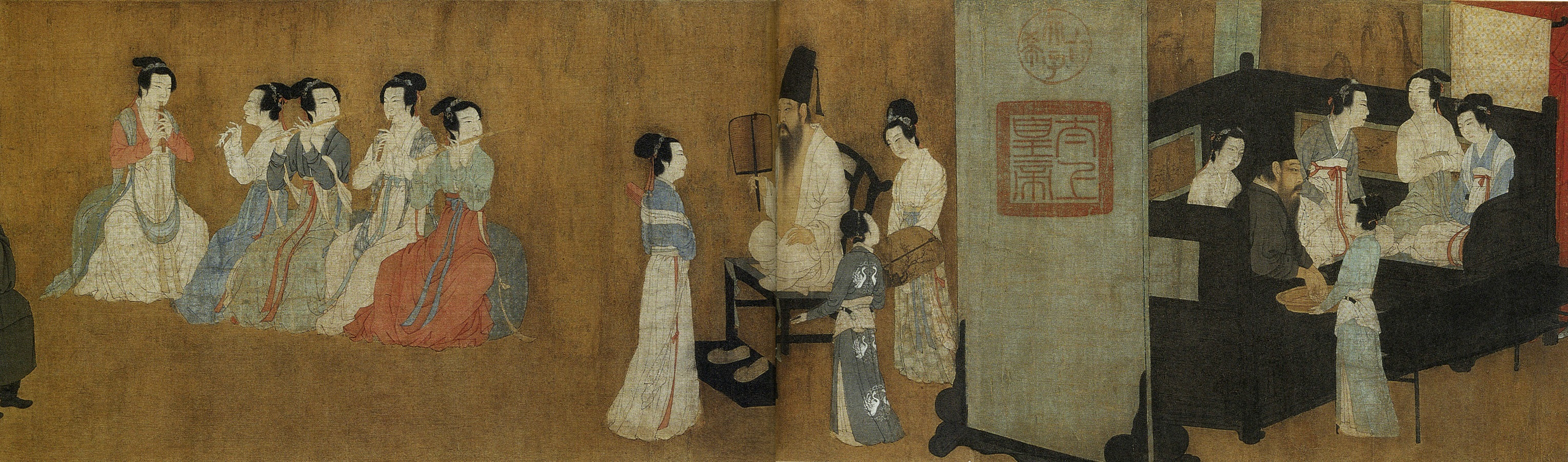
Men and women in the painting The Night Revels of Han Xizai, copy after the original painting of Southern Tang painter, Gu Hongzhong.

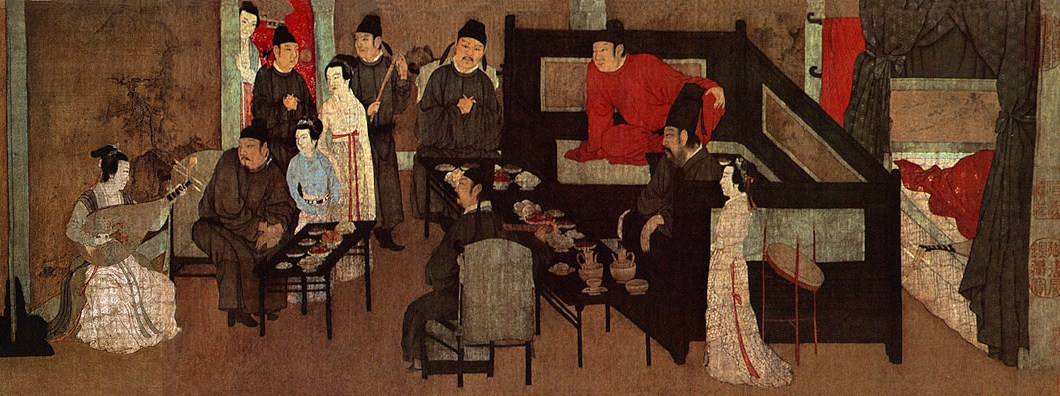
Men and women in the painting The Night Revels of Han Xizai, copy after the original painting of Southern Tang painter, Gu Hongzhong.

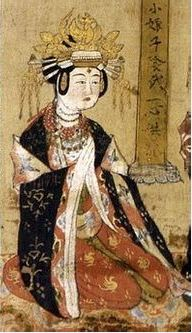
Buddhist donatress, 10th century.

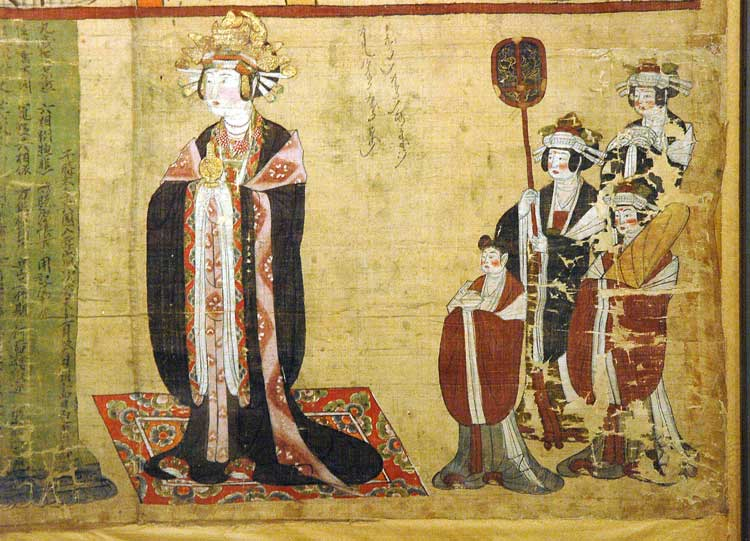
A Buddhist donor from early Northern Song dynasty.

=== Song dynasty ===
Emperor Zhezong (1077–1100); in accordance with the Song's governing philosophy, its emperors wore the same clothing as their ministers.

The Song dynasty clothing system was established at the beginning of the Northern Song dynasty. Clothes could be classified into two major types: officials garments (further differentiated between court clothing and daily wear), and the garment for ordinary people. Some features of Tang dynasty clothing were carried into the Song dynasty, such as court dress.

Song dynasty court dress often used red colour, with accessories made of different colours and materials, black leather shoes and hats. The officials had specific clothing for different occasions: (1) the sacrificial dress, a vermillion colour garment worn when attending ancestral temple or grand ceremonies, which they had to wear with the proper hats, i.e. jinxianguan, diaochanguan, and xiezhiguan; (2) the court dress, which was worn when attending court meeting held by the Emperor and sometimes during sacrificial rituals; and (3) the official gown, worn daily by officials who held ranks.

The form of officials' daily dresses had the same design regardless of rank: yuanlingpao with long and loose sleeves; however, the officials were bound to wear different colours according to ranks. As the Song dynasty followed the Tang dynasty's clothing system, officials of third ranks and above wore purple gown; fifth ranks officials wore vermillion gown; seventh ranks officials and above wore green gowns; and the ninth rank officials and above wore black gown. However, after the Yuanfeng period, changes were imposed on the colour system of the official gowns: officials of the fourth rank and above wore purple gown, the sixth rank and above wore crimson gown; and the ninth rank and above officials wore green gown; this noted the removal of black colour as a colour for the official dress. Officials also wore leather belts and kerchiefs as ornaments. If senior officials were allowed to wear purple or crimson official garments, they had to wear a silver or gold fish-shaped bag as ornament. The official gown were worn with different styles of futou and guan. For example, jinxianguan was worn by general officials; diaochanguan was worn by senior officials; and xiezhiguan was worn by enforcement officials. Flowers pinning was a well-liked custom in the Song dynasty; people regardless of their age, gender, and social ranks would pin flowers on themselves; these flowers could be either artificial flowers (i.e. made of silk, rice-paper plant flower, coloured glaze flower, etc.) or natural fresh flowers. Since the early Song dynasty, the Emperor would bestow valuable flowers to his officials. Court eunuchs would pin flowers on the futou of the Princes and the Grand councillors whereas other officials would also ornate their futou with flowers by themselves. This custom was developed and extended up until Southern Song, when regulations on the number of flowers which could be worn based on the official's rank were made. These rules on these flower ornaments on futou could not be broken without permission. The apparels for court gathering in the Song dynasty was tongtianguanfu; it was worn by the most senior officials who served the emperor directly; it was the most important clothing after the clothing worn by the emperor.

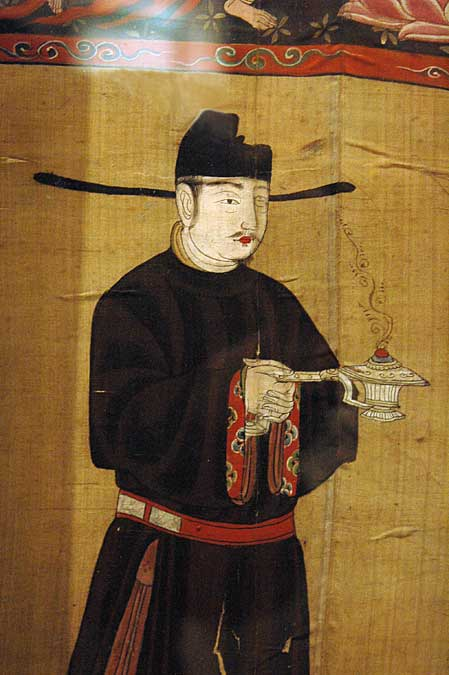
Male Buddhist Donor, Northern Song Dynasty, 981 AD.

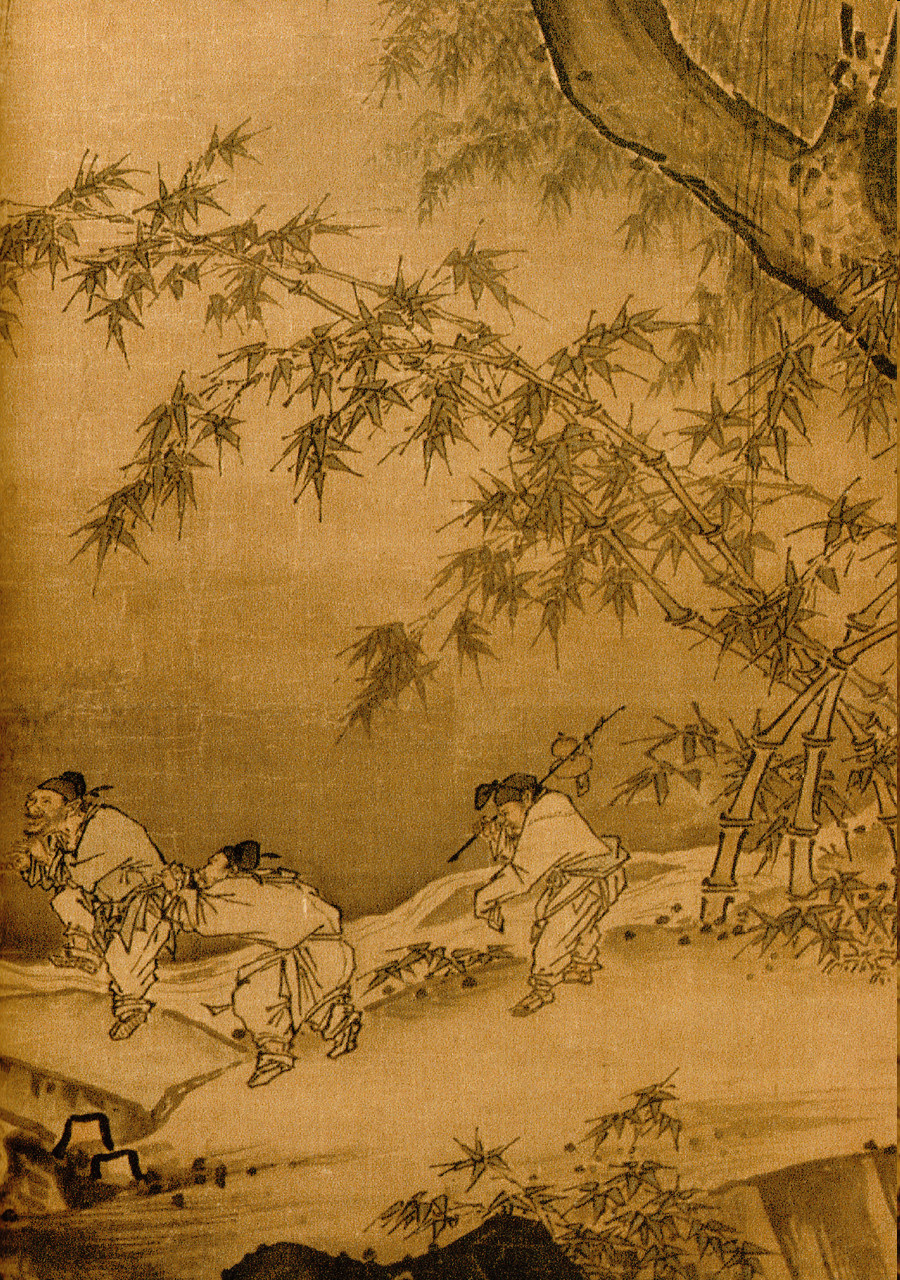
Peasants returning from work, Song dynasty.

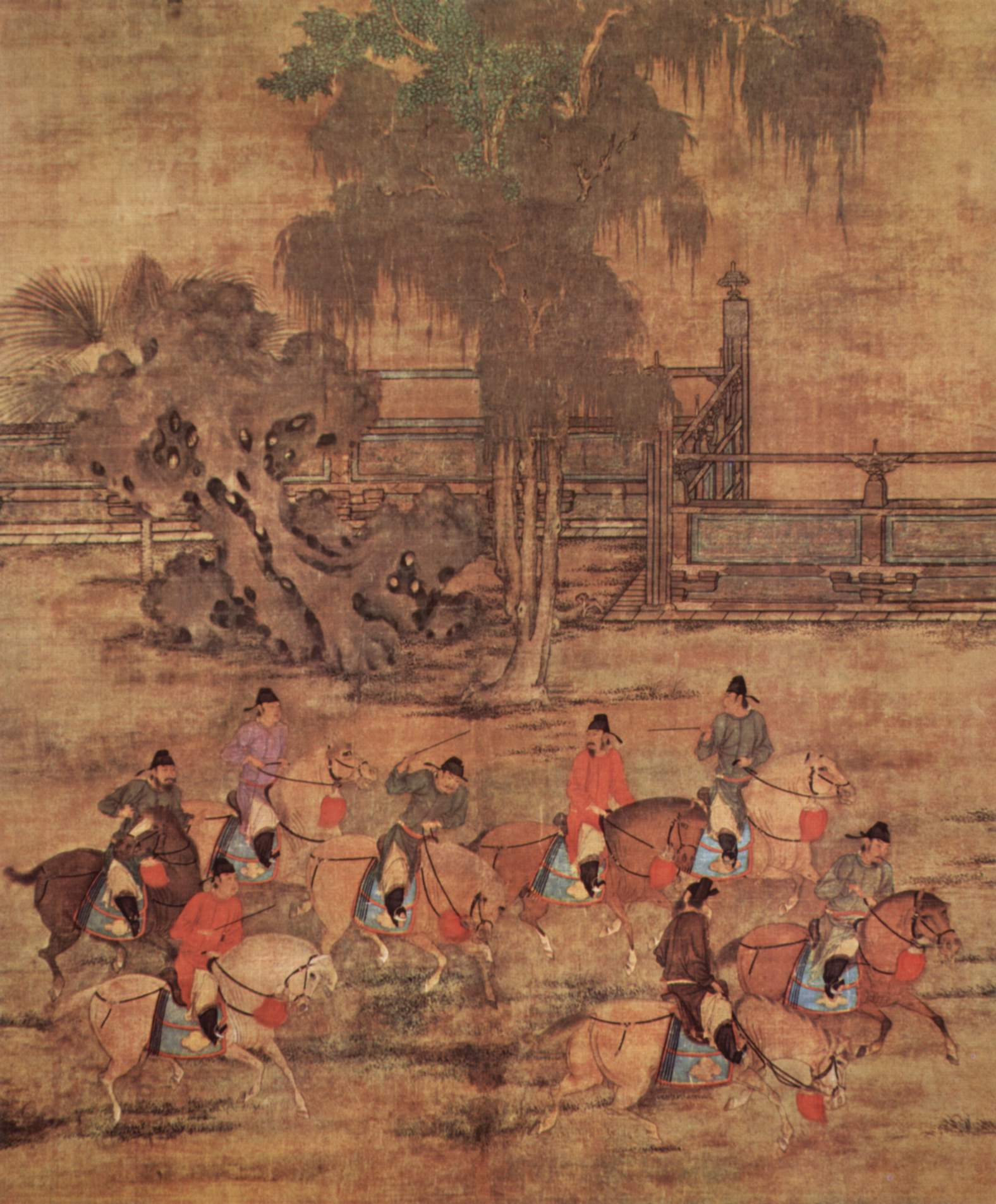
Polo players, Song dynasty.

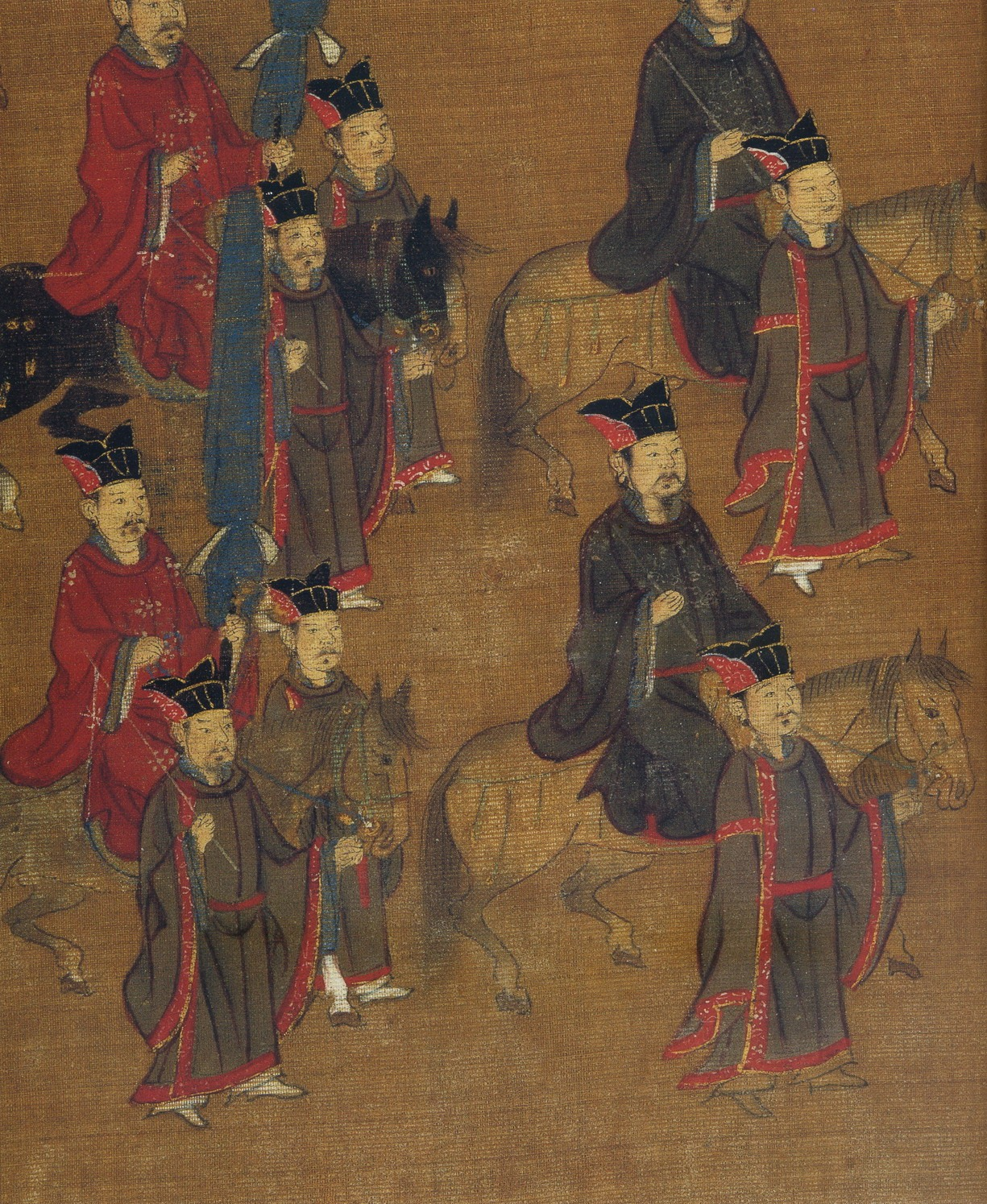
Song dynasty imperial procession, Northern Song.

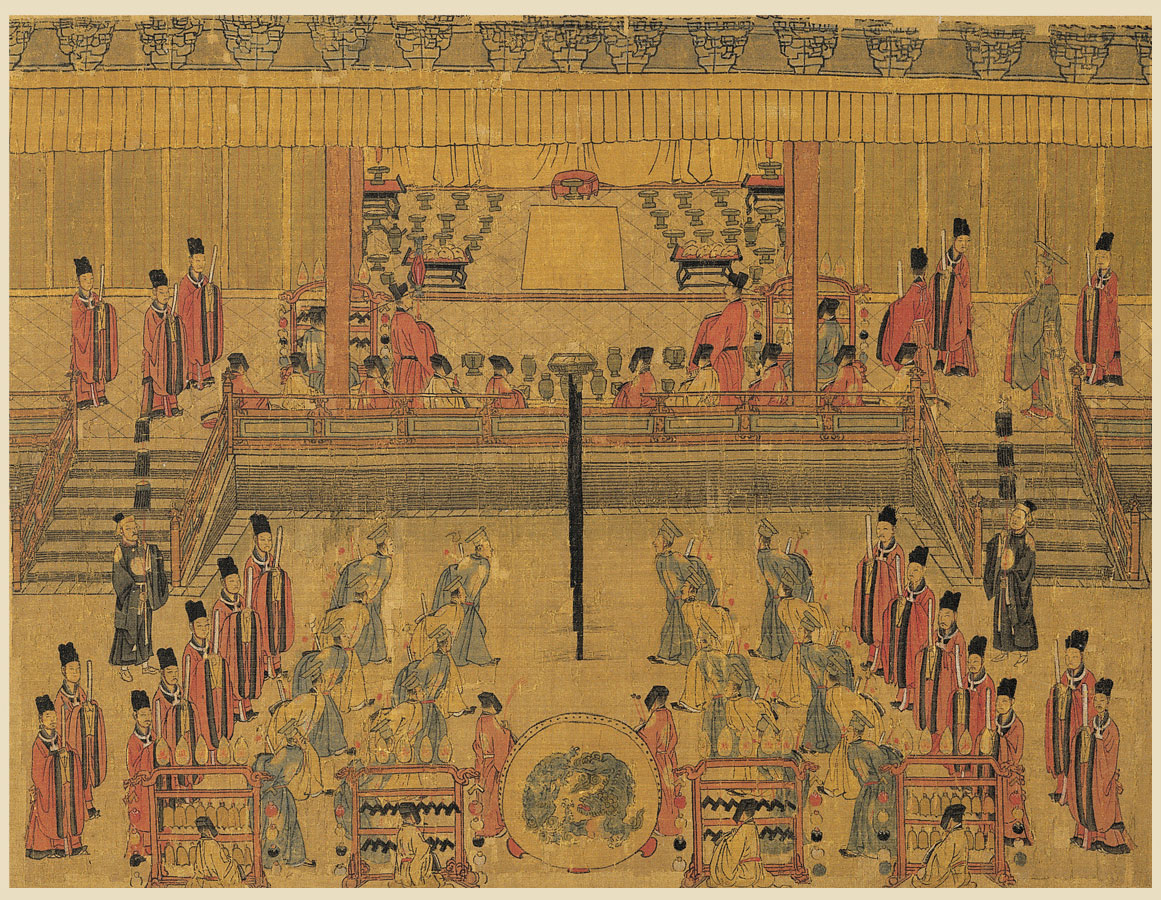
Song dynasty ritual ceremony, with officials attending in ceremonial chaofu (朝服).

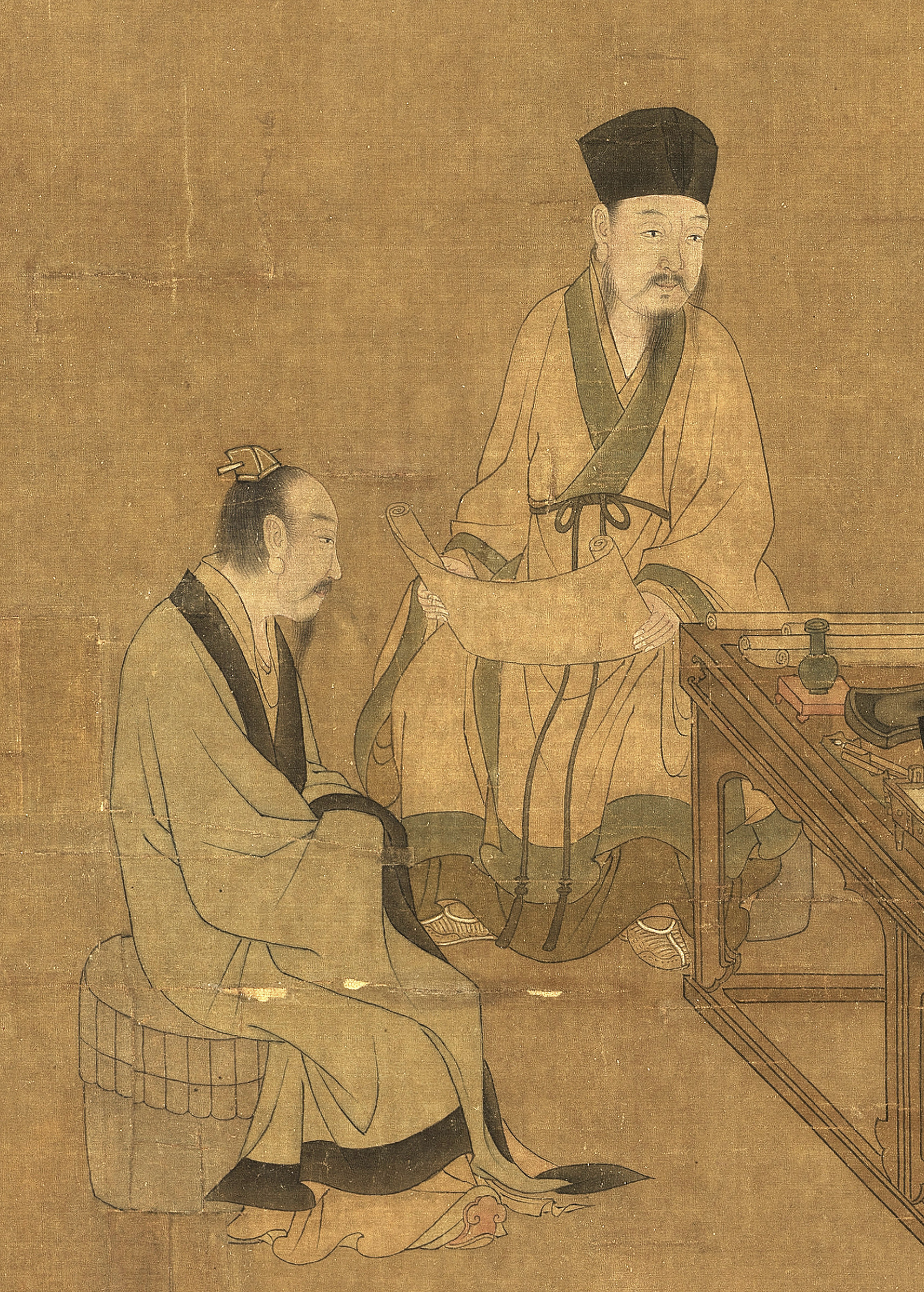
Two men wearing daopao.

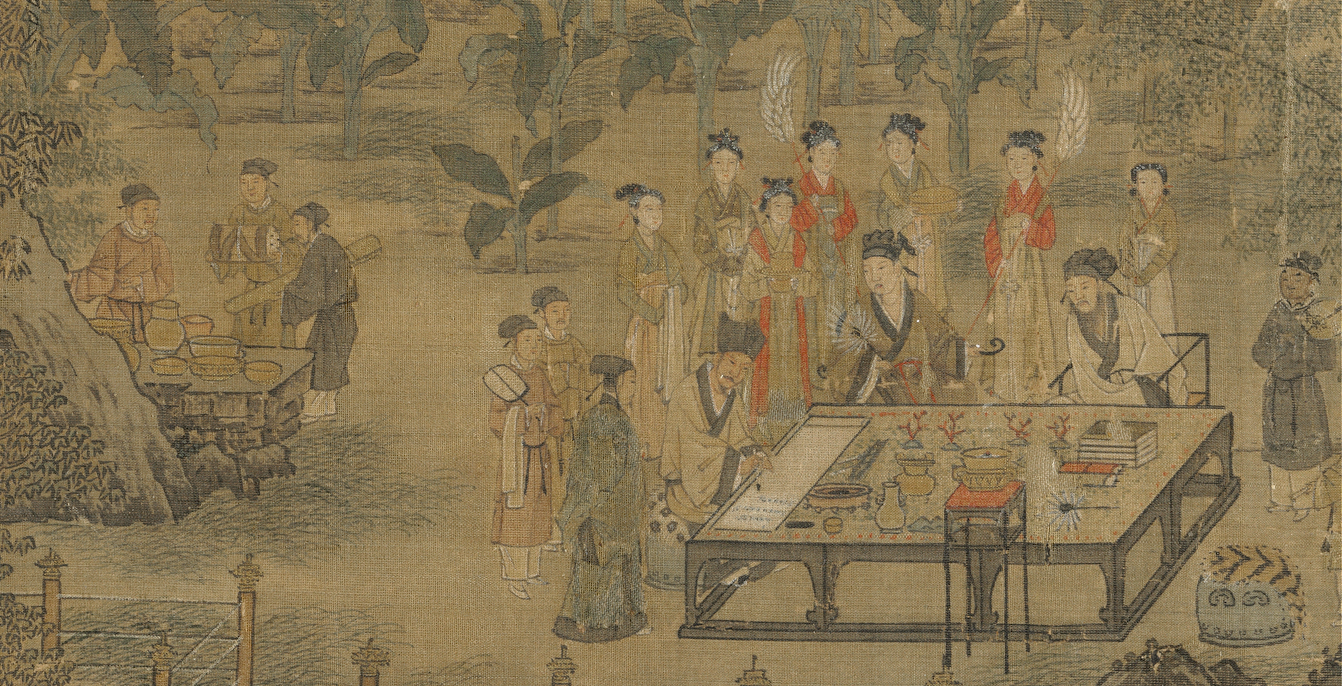
Scholars and attendants in Literary Gathering in the Western Garden.

The clothes worn by Song dynasty emperors are collectively called tianzi apparel (天子服饰; the emperor's apparel). The apparels worn when attending sacrificial and worshipping ceremonies were daqiumian (大裘冕; a type of mianfu), gunmian (衮冕; a type of mianfu), and lüpao (履袍). The emperor's daily wears were shanpao (衫袍) and zhaipao (窄袍). The yuyue fu (御阅服) was the formal military uniform worn by the Song dynasty Emperors and only came into existence in the Southern Song dynasty. The crown prince would wear the gunmian (衮冕) when he would accompanied the emperor to sacrificial ceremonies, and he would wear yuanyouguanfu (远游冠服) and zhumingfu (朱明衣) on less formal but important occasions such as nobility conferring and appointment, when paying visits to the founding ancestor's temple and when attending court meetings which are held by the Emperor. The Crown prince also wear purple official dress, gold and jade waistband, and wore a folding-up black muslin scarf on his head.

Although some of clothing in the Song dynasty have similaritiesref name="dx.doi.org" /> In the 7th and 8th centuries, the kuapao, which originated from Central Asia could be worn by men and were also used as main garment for cross-dressing attendants or could be draped across the shoulders like a cloak. with previous dynasties, some unique characteristics separate it from the rest. While most of them following the Tang dynasty style, the revival of Confucianism influenced the women clothing of the Song dynasty; Confucians in the Song dynasty revered antiquity and wanted to revive some old ideas and customs and encouraged women to reject the extravagance of the Tang dynasty fashion. Due to the shift in philosophical thought, the aesthetics of the Song dynasty clothing showed simplicity and became more traditional in style. Palace ladies searched for guidance in the Rites of Zhou on how to dress accordingly to ceremonial events and carefully chose ornaments which were graded for each occasion based on the classic rituals. While women of the Tang dynasty liked clothing which emphasized on body curves and sometimes revealed décolletage, women in the Song dynasty perceived such styles as obscene and vulgar and preferred slender body figure. Donning clothing which looked simple and humble instead of extravagant was interpreted as expressing sober virtue. The Song dynasty clothing system also specified how women of the imperial court had to dress themselves and this included the Song empresses, the imperial concubines, and the titled gentlewomen; their clothing would also change depending on occasions. Song dynasty empresses wear the huiyi; they often had three to five distinctive jewelry-like marks on their face (two side of the cheek, other two next to the eyebrows and one on the forehead). The everyday clothing of the Empresses and Imperial concubines included: long skirts, loose-sleeves garments, tasselled capes and beizi. Imperial concubines like the colour yellow and red; the pomegranate colour skirt was also popular in the Song dynasty. Collar edges and sleeve edges of all clothes that have been excavated were decorated with laces or embroidered patterns. Such clothes were decorated with patterns of peony, camellia, plum blossom, and lily, etc. Pleated skirts were introduced and became the characteristic skirts of the upper social class.

Painting of famous ministers dressed in typical Song dynasty clothing.
Portrait of Song Taizu wearing a white round-collar gown and a zhanchi futou (展翅幞頭; lit. spread wings hat), c.1000 AD.

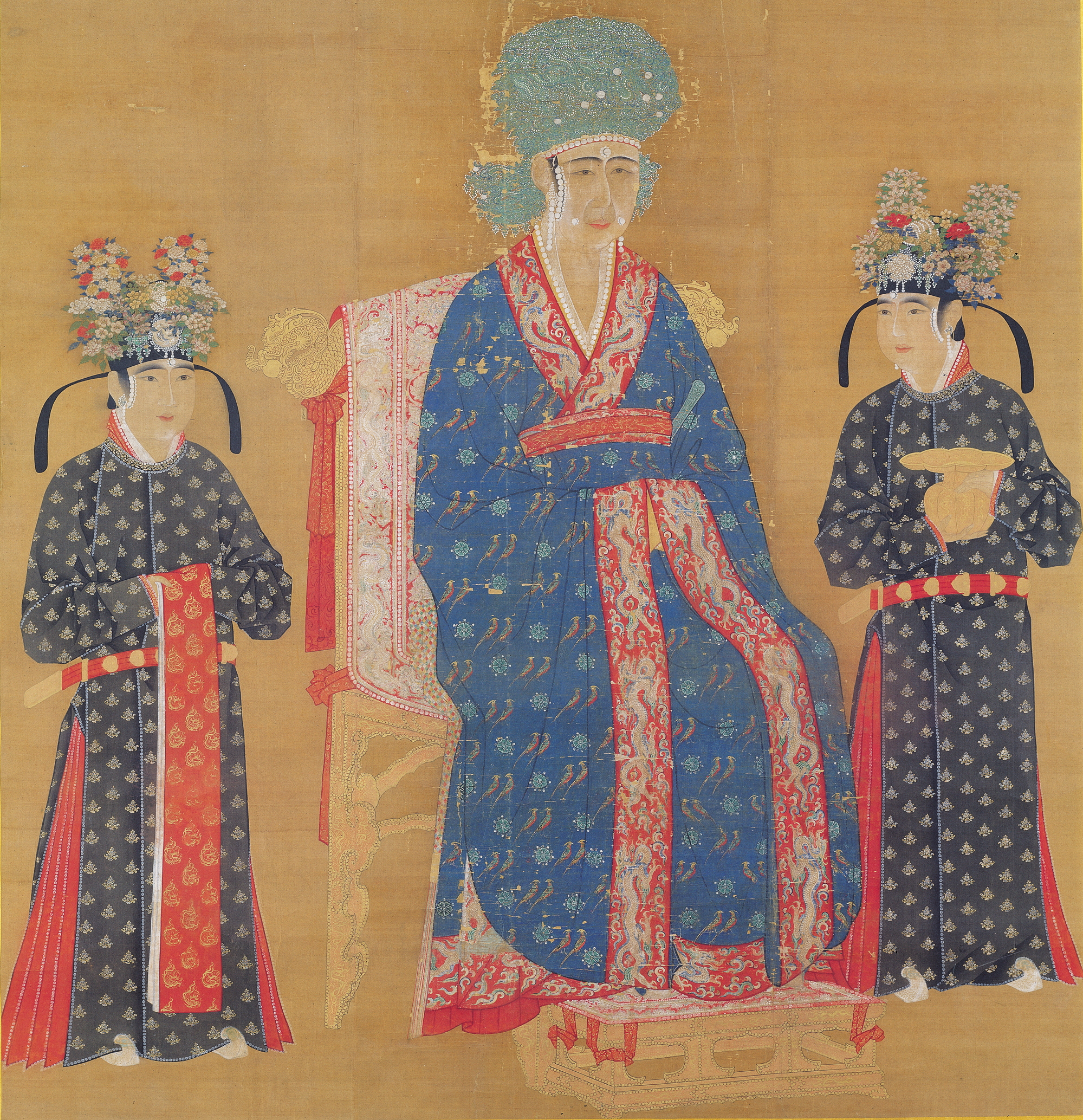
Empress Cao wearing a huiyi with two court ladies wearing a round-collar gown with red pleated skirts, Song dynasty.

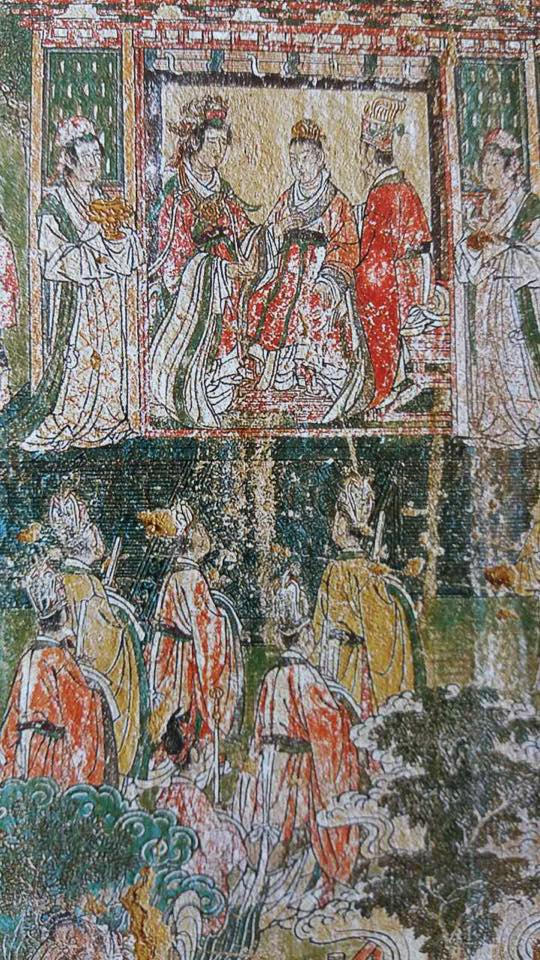
Emperor and empress, Fresco from the Temple of Enlightenment – Life of Buddha, Song dynasty.

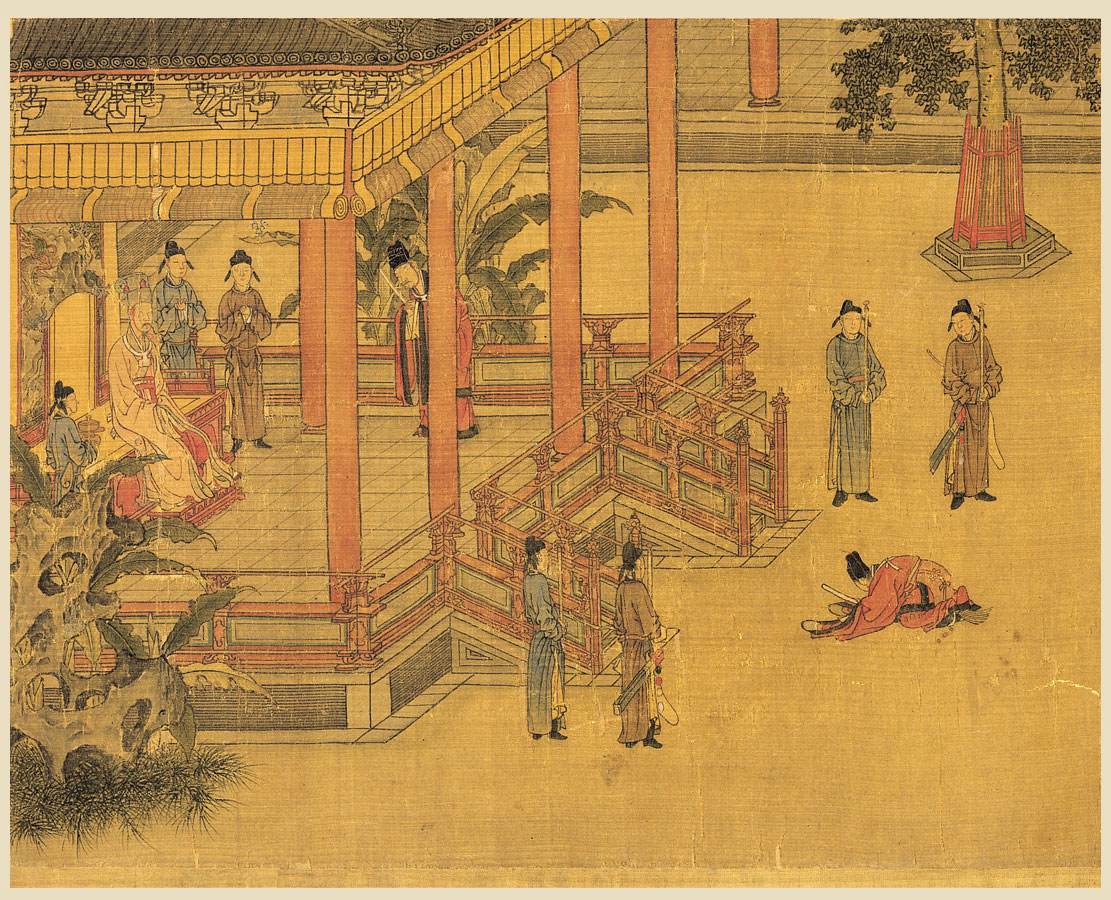
Official paying respects to emperor in tongtianguanfu (通天冠服).

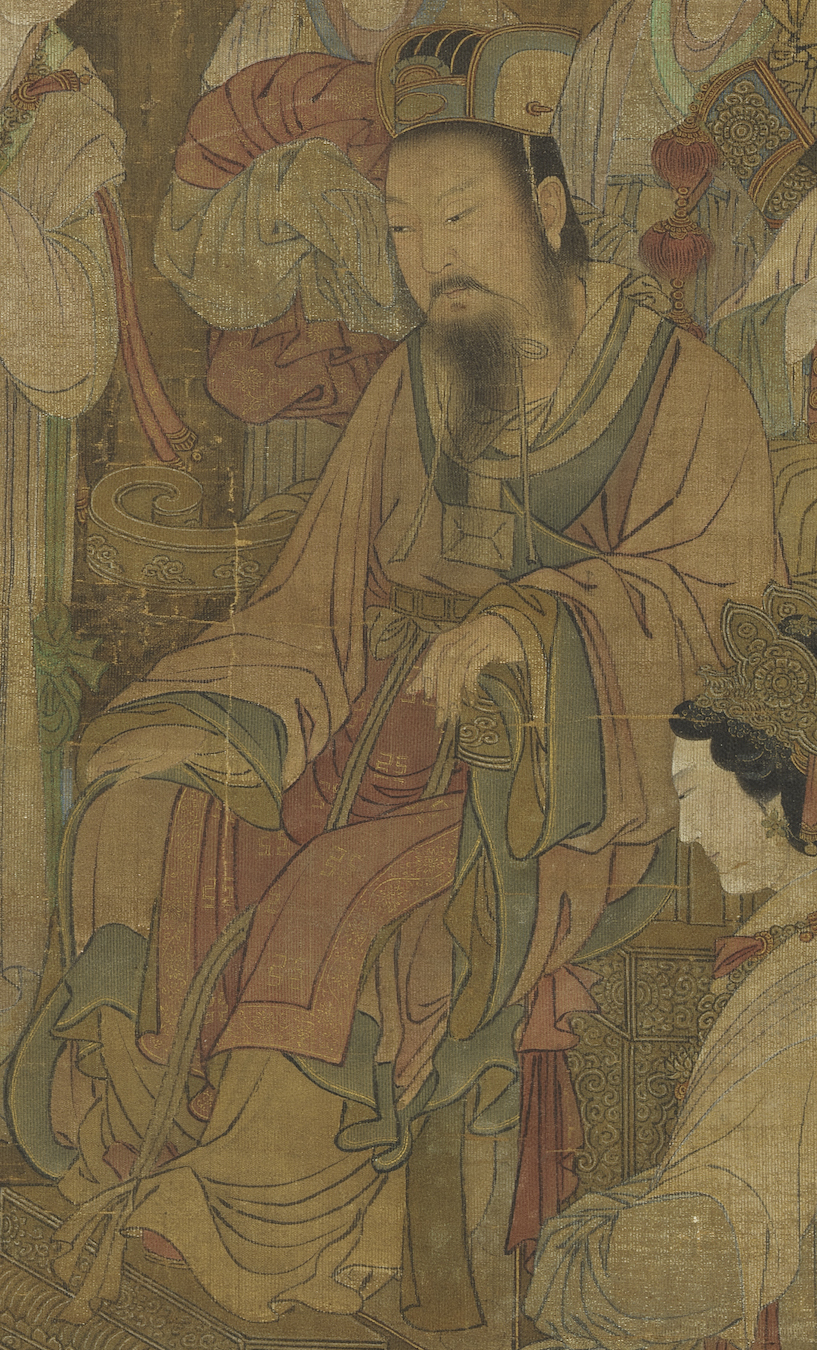
A Song dynasty period painting of Emperor Wen of Han in casual wear, or bianfu.

According to the Song dynasty's regulations, ordinary people were only allowed to wear white clothes; but at some point, the regulations changed and ordinary people, as well as administrative clerks and intellectuals, were able to wear black clothes. However, in reality, the clothing worn by civilians were much more colourful than what was stipulated as many colours were used in the garments and skirts. Ordinary people also dressed differently accordingly to their social status and occupations.

One of the common clothing styles for woman during the Song dynasty was beizi, which were usually regarded as shirt or jacket and could be matched with ru, which was a necessary clothing for daily life of commoners, a qun (裙; skirt) or ku (袴; trousers). There are two size of beizi: the short one is crown rump length and the long one extended to the knees. According to the sacrificial and ceremonial apparel system drafted by Zhu Xi, women should wear an overcoat, a long skirt, and the beizi. Women also wore the liangpian qun (两片裙), a wrap skirt which consist of two pieces of fabric sewn to a separate, single waistband with ties.

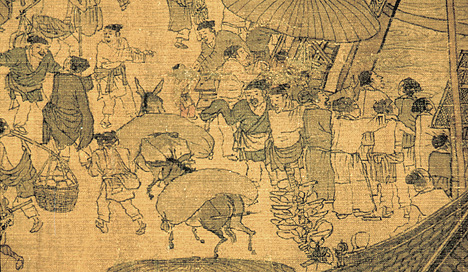
Commoners as seen on Along the River During the Qingming Festival.

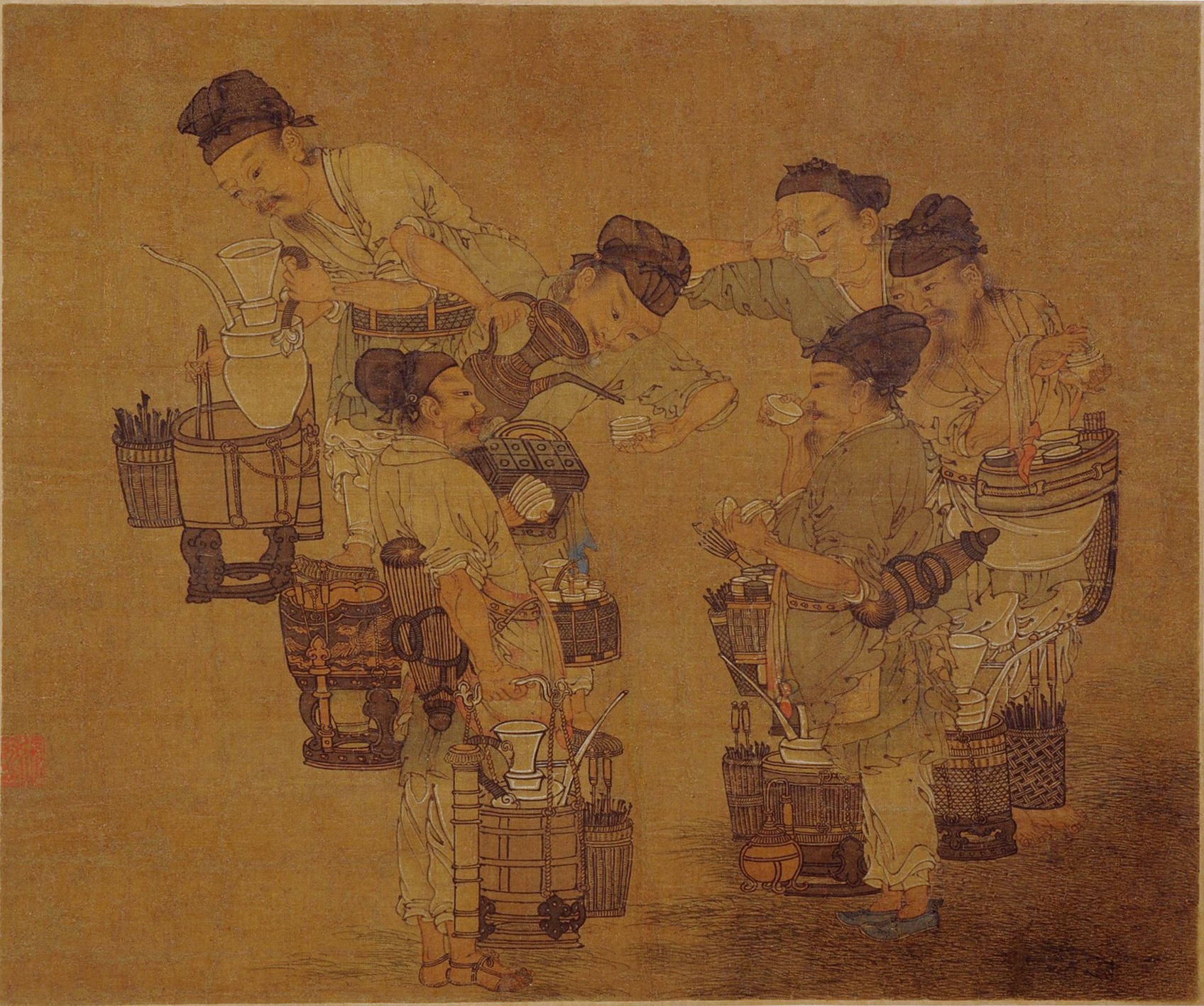
Commoners engaged in "tea fighting".

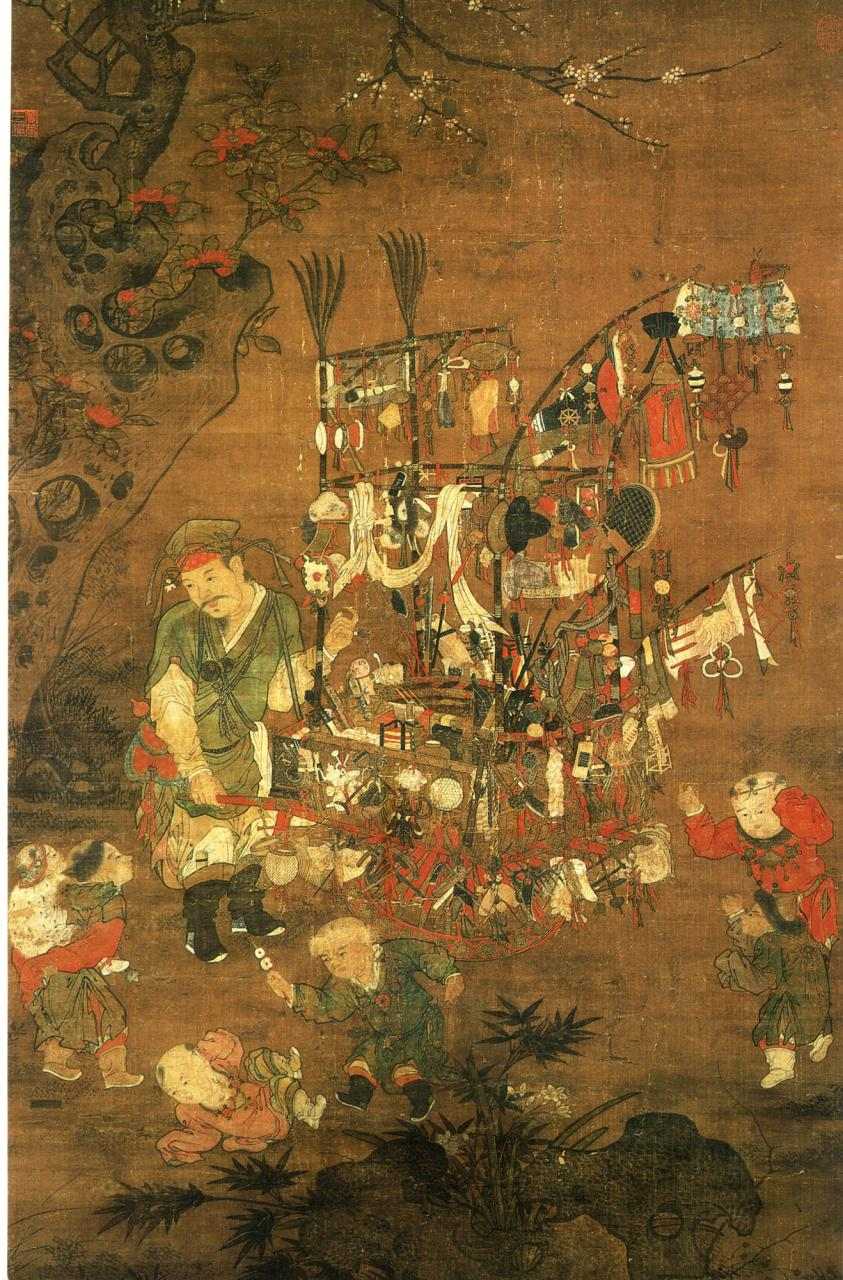
A "Knickknack Peddler", by Su Hanchen.

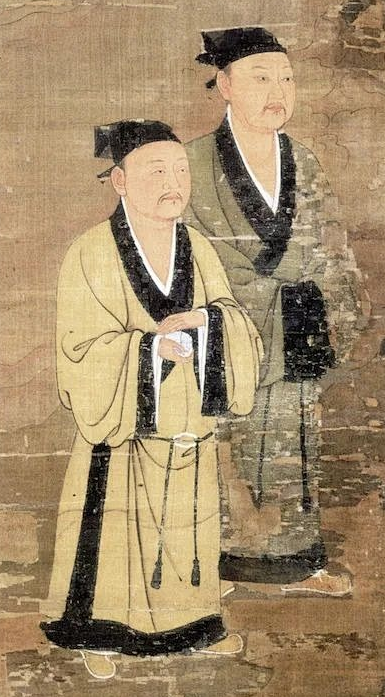
Scholars wearing zhiduo-robes and rujin (儒巾) headscarf. Various kinds of headscarves became fashionable among the commoners and the educated gentry.

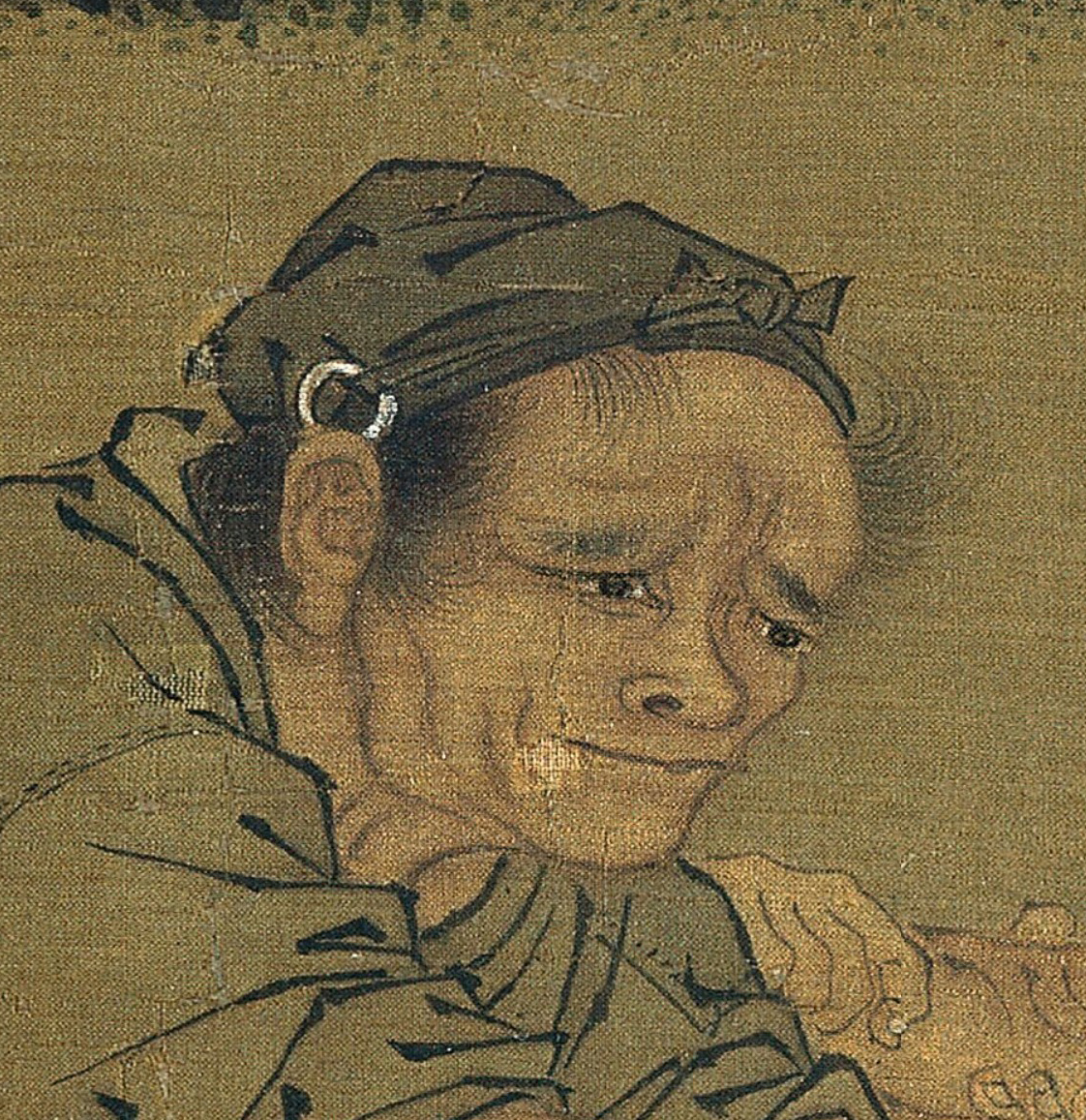
In the Song dynasty, the headscarf was also secured with a decorative ring.

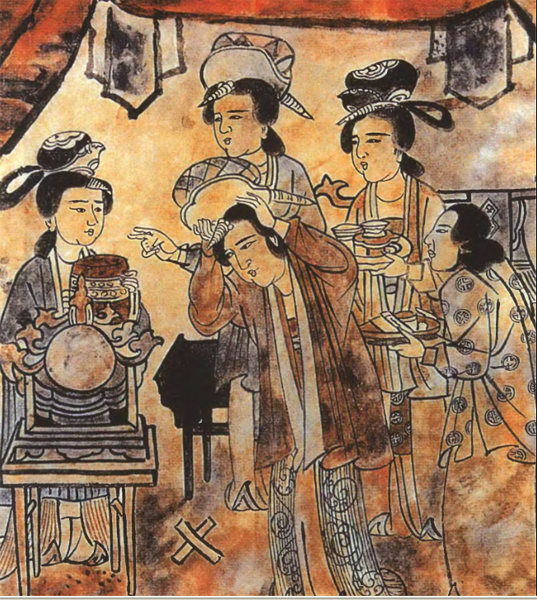
Song dynasty women wearing beizi; Northern Song dynasty.

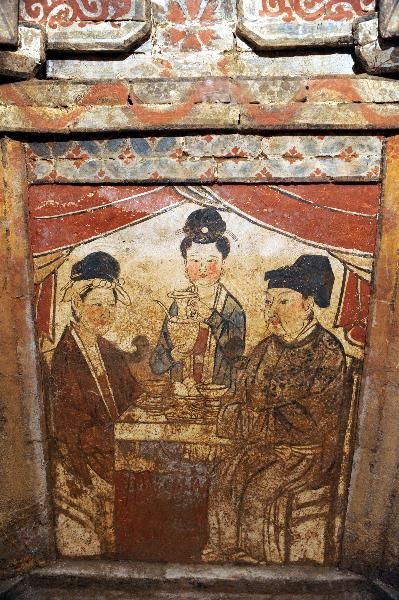
Song Dynasty Tomb Painting Found in Tengfeng City 6.

A painting, called Sericulture, by the painter Liang Kai in Southern Song dynasty depicts rural labourers in the process of making silk. Foot binding also became popular in the Song dynasty at the end of the dynasty.

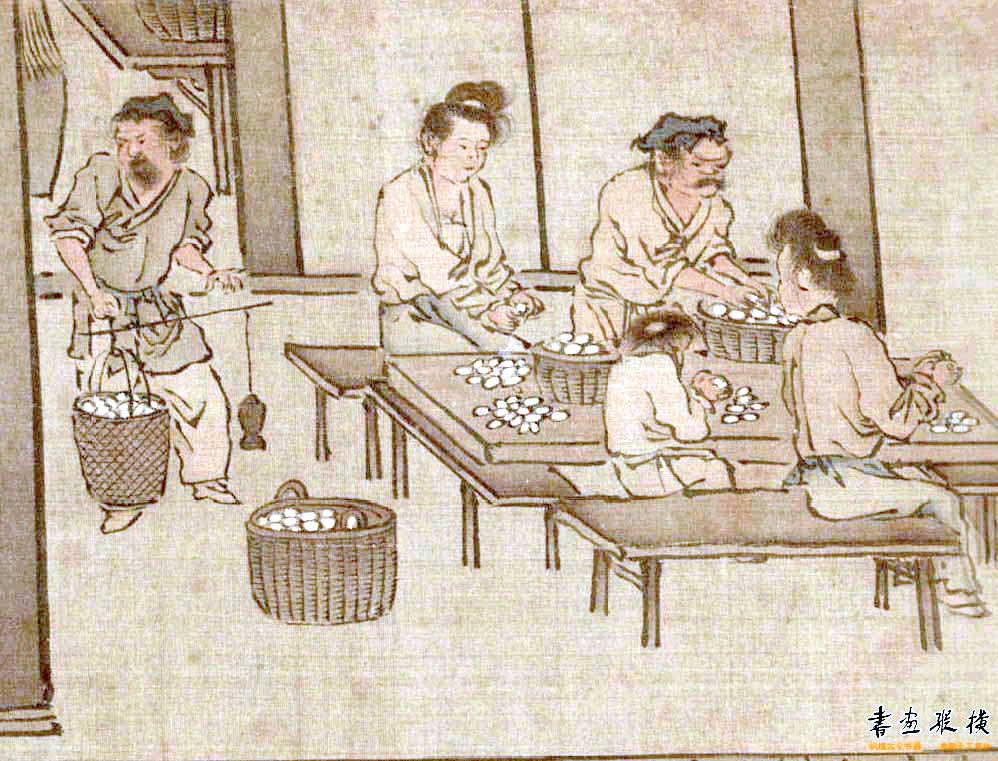
Man wearing shanku, Weighing and sorting the cocoons, from the painting Sericulture, Southern Song dynasty, c.1200 AD.

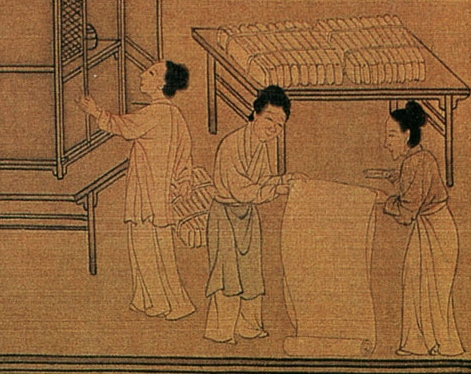
Women wearing ruqun. Trousers could be worn under the skirt.

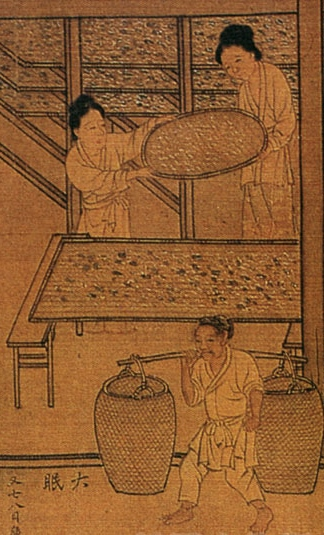
Song dynasty painting, 12th century.

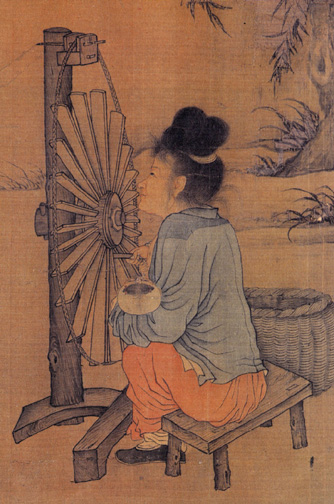
A working woman who is wearing trousers, Song dynasty painting.

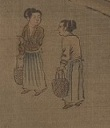
Rural women wearing pleated skirts with a shan and ru, Song dynasty.

Other casual forms of clothing included: the pao (袍; the gown which could be broad or narrow-sleeved), ao (襖; a necessary coat for commoner in their daily lives), duanhe (短褐; a short, coarse cloth jacket worn by people of low socioeconomic status), lanshan, and zhiduo.

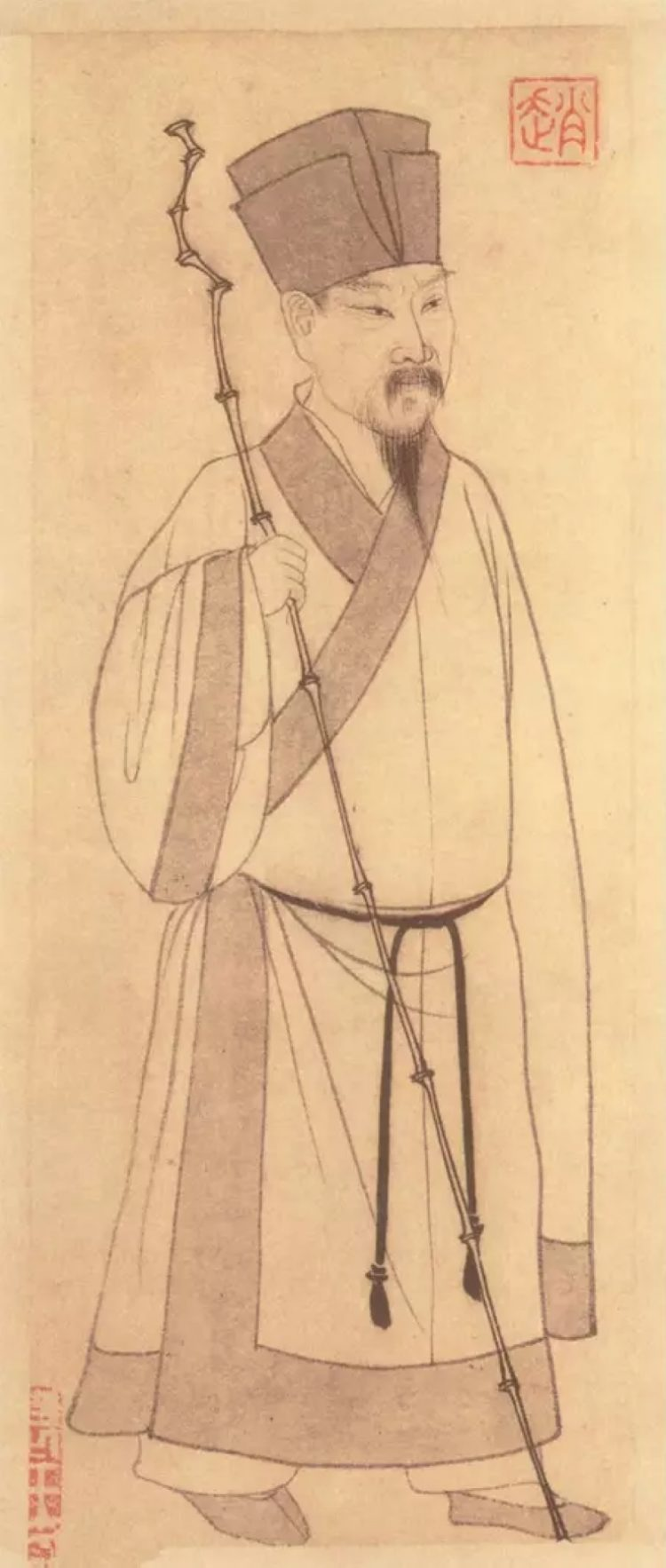
Su shi, also known as Su Dongpo, wearing the Confucian shenyi, Song dynasty.

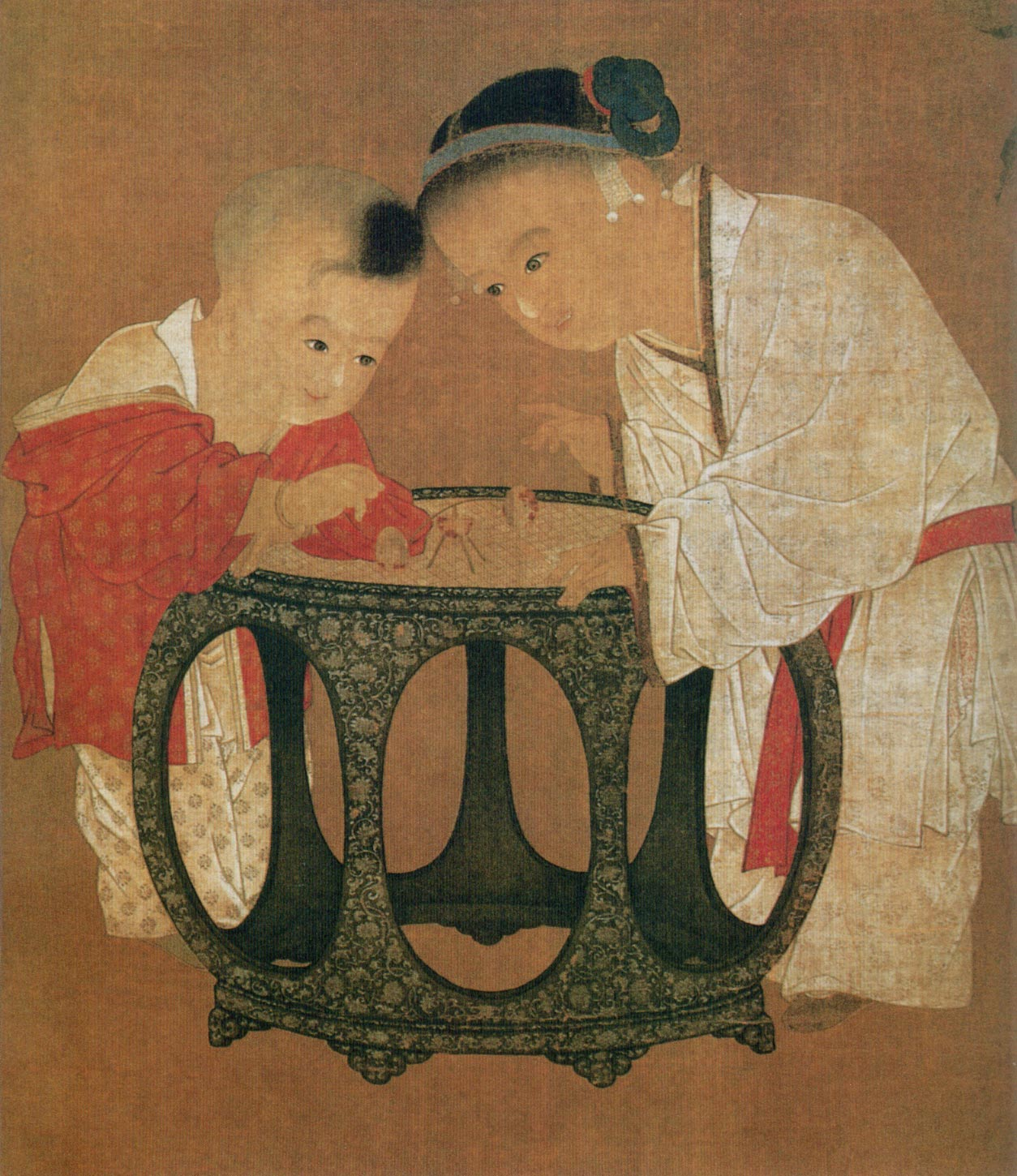
Children Playing in an Autumn Courtyard, 12th century AD, Song Dynasty.

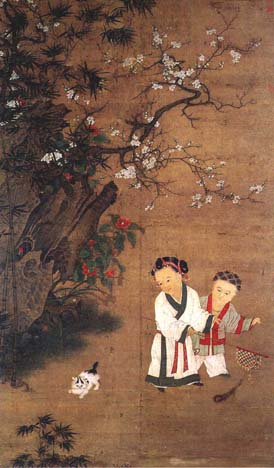
Playing Children, Painting from the mid-12th century; Song dynasty.

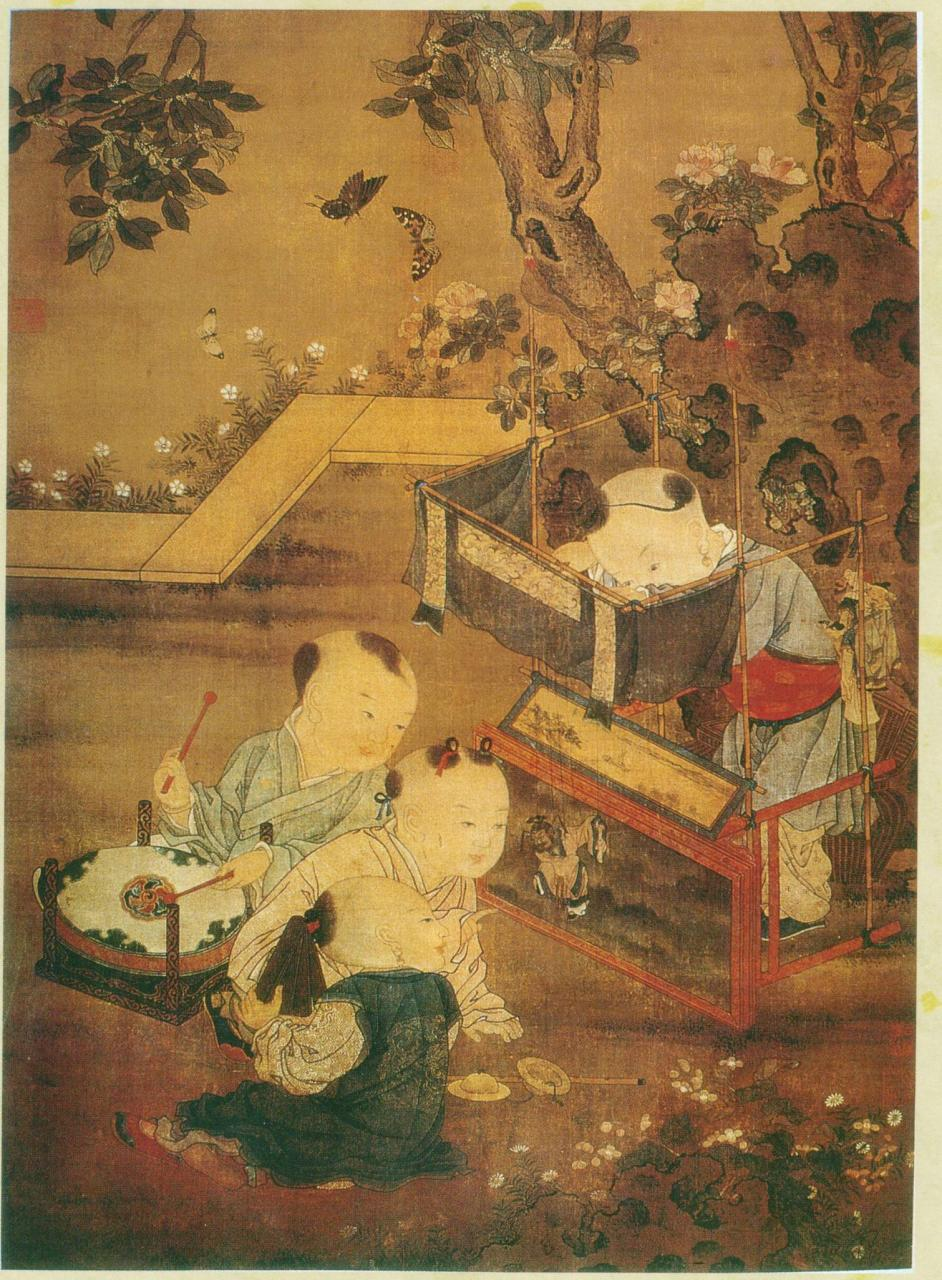
"A Children's Puppet Show", a painting by the Song-dynasty era Chinese artist, Early 12th century AD.

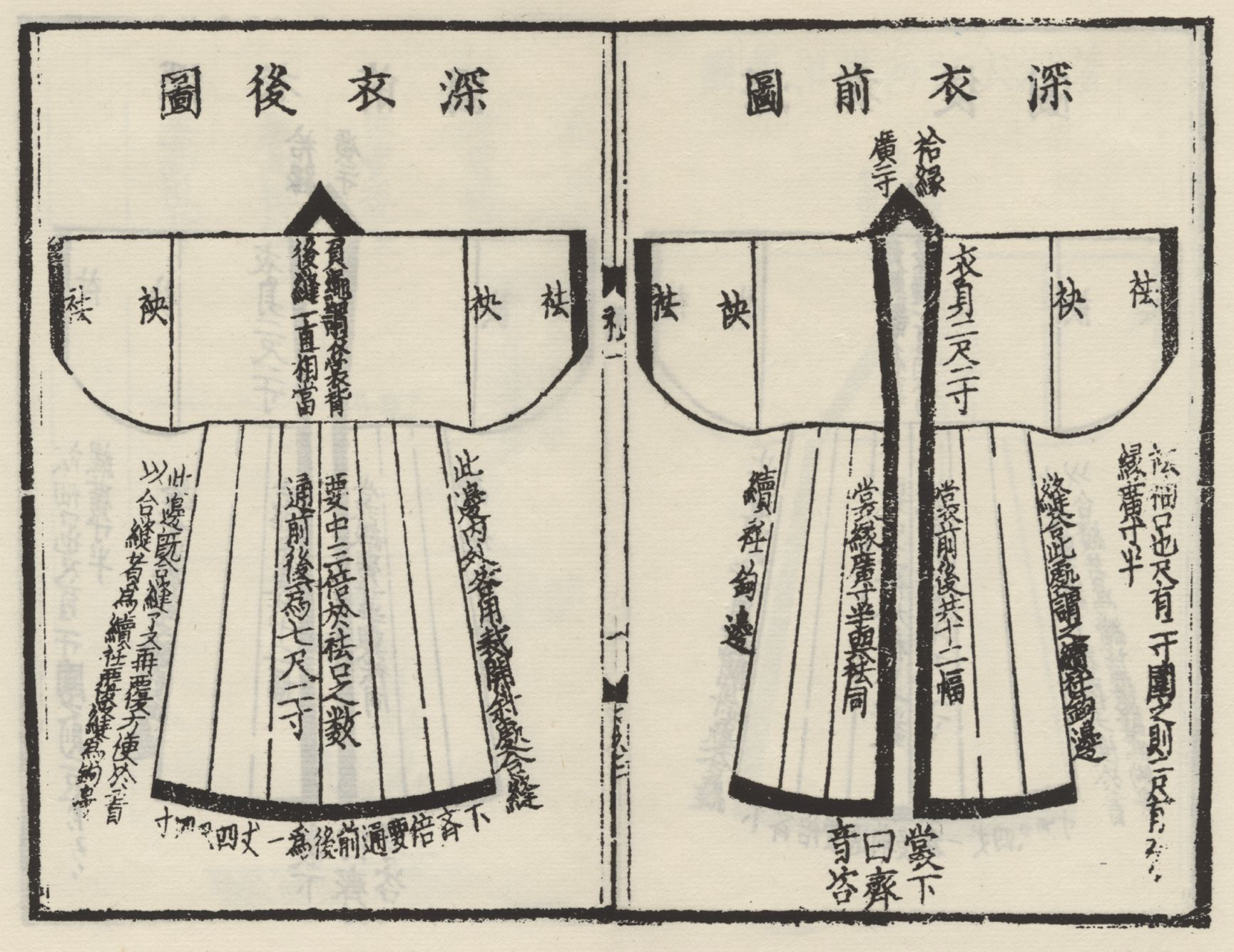
Diagram of Song dynasty shenyi based on Zhuzi jiali.

In addition, Neo-Confucian philosophies also determined the conduct code of the scholars. The Neo-Confucians re-constructed the meaning of the shenyi, restored, and re-invented it as the attire of the scholars. Some Song dynasty scholars, such as Zhu Xi and Shaoyong, made their own version of the scholar gown, shenyi, based on The book of Rites, while scholars such as Jin Lüxiang promoted it among his peers. However, the shenyi used as a scholar gown was not popular in the Song dynasty and was even considered as "strange garment" despite some scholar-officials appreciated it.

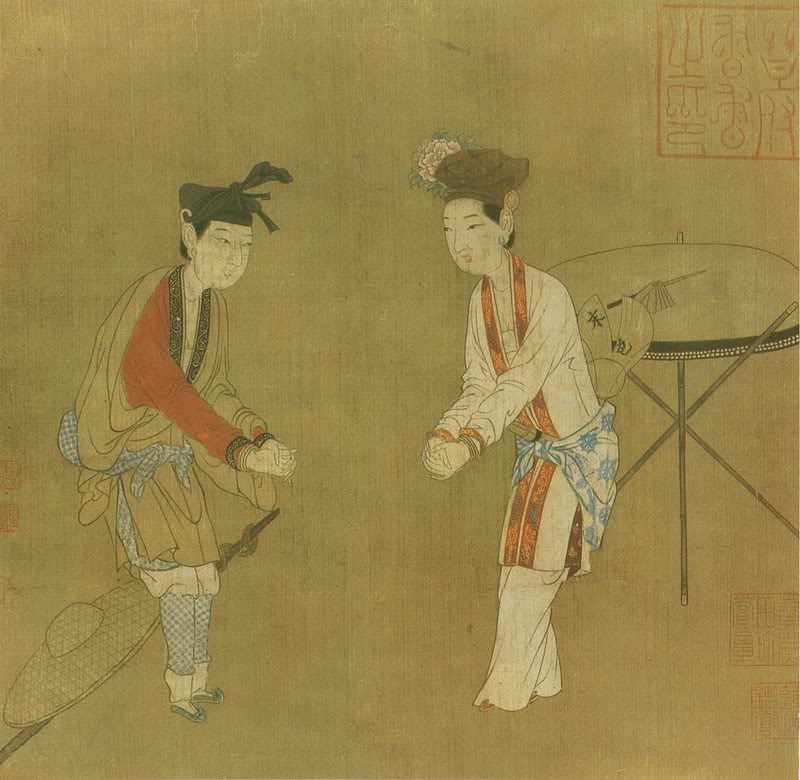
Zaju actresses in theatrical clothing playing men, wearing headscarfs with rings, Xiku and Waku trousers and leggings, Song dynasty.

In the capital of Southern Song, clothing-style from Northern China were popular. The Song dynasty court repeatedly banned people (i.e. common people, literati, and women) from wearing clothing and ornaments worn by Khitan people, such as felt hats, and from the wearing of exotic clothing. They also banned clothing with colours which was associated to Khitan clothing; such as aeruginous or yellowish-black. They also banned people, except for drama actors, from wearing Jurchen and Khitan diaodun (釣墩; a type of lower garment where the socks and trousers were connected to each other) due to its foreign ethnic nature. Song dynasty women also wore the Song-dynasty gaitou, when they would ride animals, such as horses and donkeys, to relieve embarrassment and to conceal their bodies. These veils originated from the Tang dynasty women's weimao which covered the head and upper body; they were revived in Song after they fell out of fashion in Tang dynasty and were worn despite its masculine and barbarian origin, probably because Song women were unaware of its origins. Many of Song dynasty clothing was later adopted in the Yuan and Ming dynasties.

=== Liao, Western Xia, and Jin dynasties ===
==== Liao dynasty ====
The rulers of the Liao dynasty adopted a clothing system which allowed the coexistence of Han Chinese and Khitan clothing. The Khitan court adopted both the guofu (國服; Khitan National garments) and hanfu, which the Khitan inherited from the Later Jin dynasty and were actually clothing from the Tang dynasty. The guofu of the Liao dynasty was also heavily influenced by the Hanfu system.

The Han Chinese men living in the Liao dynasty were not required to wear the shaved Khitan hairstyle which Khitan men wore to distinguish their ethnicity, unlike the Qing dynasty which mandated wearing of the Manchu hairstyle for men. In Han Chinese tombs dating from Liao dynasty, there are tombs murals which depicts purely Chinese customs and Chinese clothing. Tombs in haner families, for example the Zhang and Hann families, often depicts men dressed in Khitan clothing in corridors and antechambers while inner culture shows haner culture. (Note: The term 'haner' refers to Han Chinese of mixed origins or who have adopted some Khitan customs.) Some Han Chinese or Haner men adopted and/or combined Hanfu with Khitan clothing and boots, wore Hanfu or wore Khitan clothes. Han women on the other hand did not adopt Khitan dress and continued wearing Hanfu. For example, the tomb of Hann Shixun (a man from distinguished haner families) who died in the early 12th century during the late Liao dynasty depict Khitan-style clothing in the antechamber whereas women in Hanfu-style clothing is seen in the painting found in the inner chamber. Another example can be seen in a mural painting found in the tomb of Zhao Wenzao, where children and servants are depicted wearing Khitan hairstyles and Khitan-style clothing, while the woman who is standing behind the table is depicted in Han Chinese clothing. Han Chinese women living in the Southern Division and Haner women were culture bearers, who generally preserved Han Chinese culture and continued to wear Hanfu which was worn prior to the conquest. Both Khitan women and Han Chinese women in the Liao wore Han style Tang-Song dress.

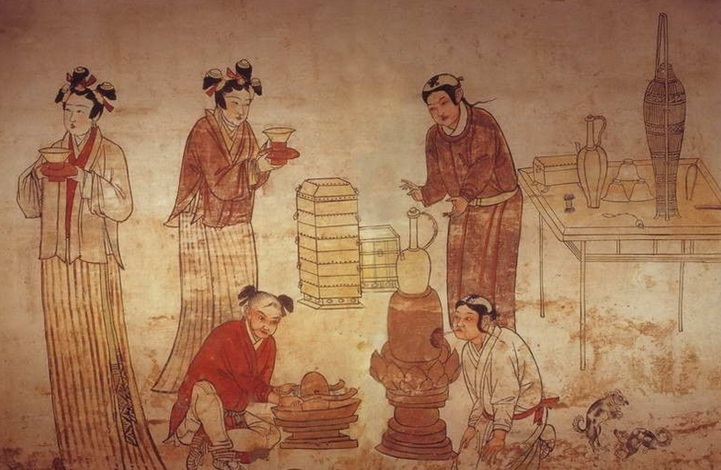
Children and servants wear Khitan-style clothing and hairstyle; the standing women wears Song-style hanfu, Mural painting from the Tomb of Zhang Kuangzheng (M10), Liao dynasty, 1058–1093 AD.

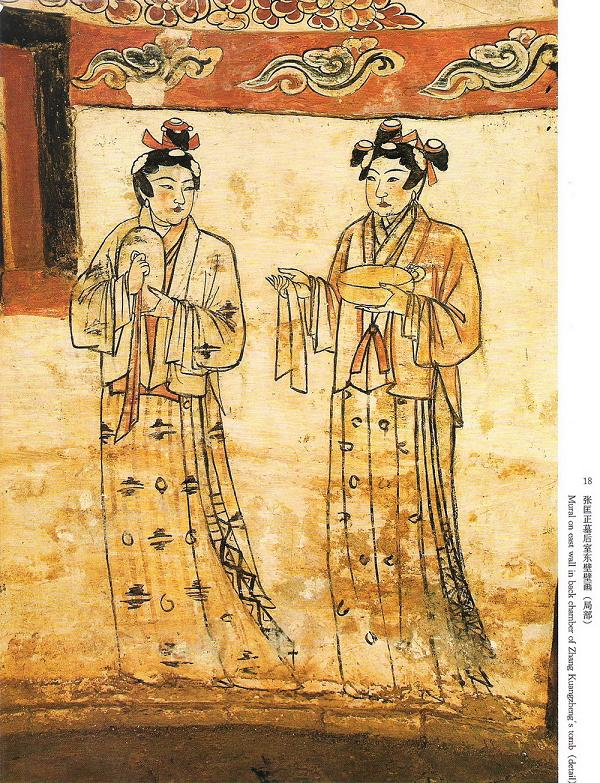
Women wearing Song-style clothing, consisting of shanqun (upper garment over skirt) and beizi, inner chamber of the Tomb of Zhang Kuangzheng, Liao dynasty.

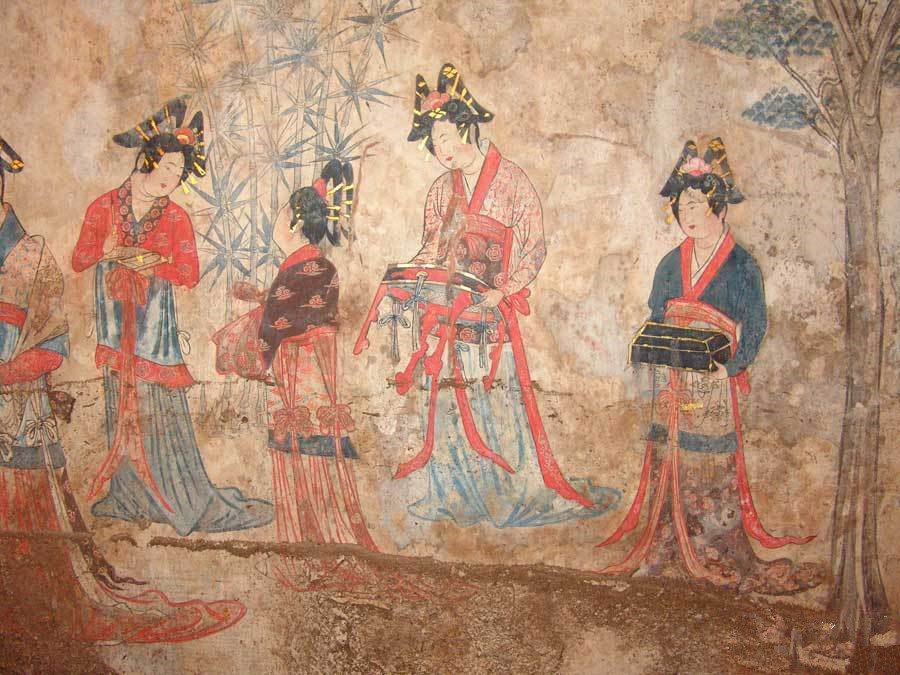
Khitan women wearing Tang-style ruqun; Baoshan tomb No.2 wall-painting of Liao dynasty.

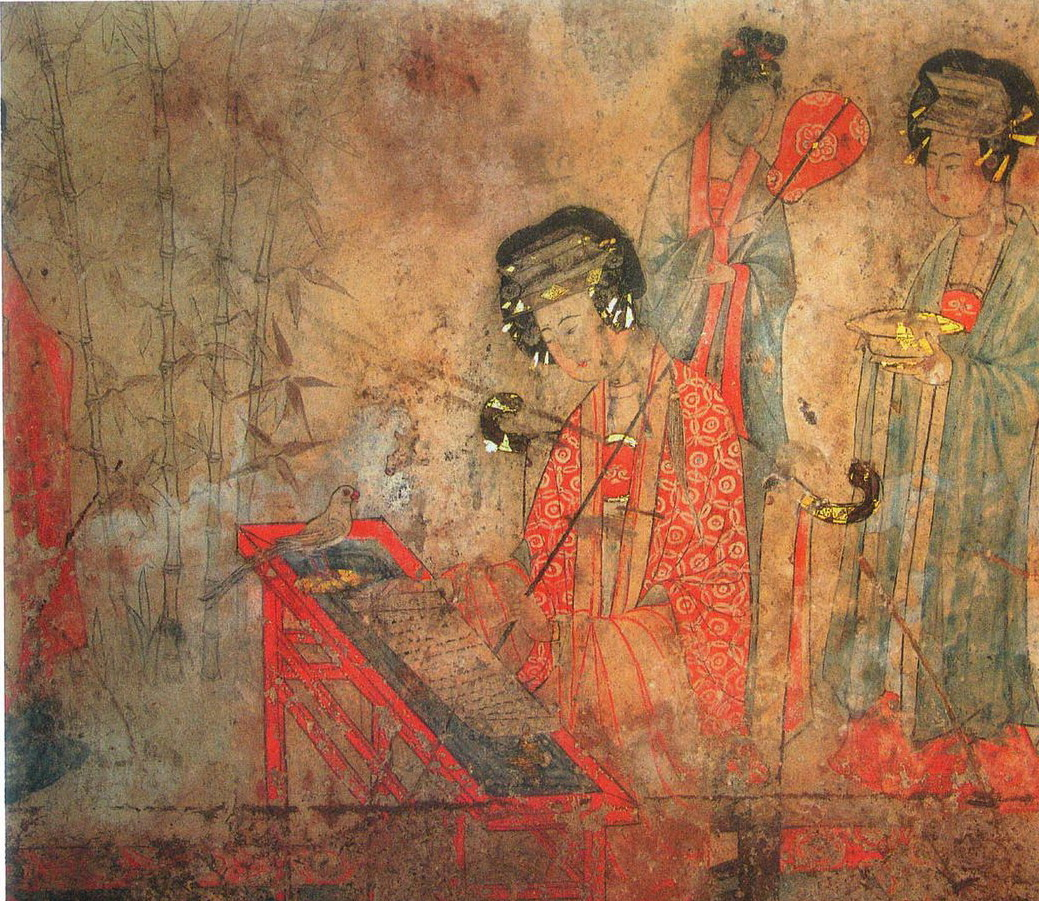
Khitan women wearing Tang-style qixiong ruqun, Baoshan tomb No.2 wall-painting of Liao dynasty.

==== Jin dynasty ====
The Jin dynasty rulers imitated the Song dynasty and decided to establish their own carriages and apparel system. In the early period of the Jin dynasty, the Jin dynasty court first attempted to impose Jurchen hairstyle and clothes on the Han Chinese population in 1126 AD and in 1129 AD. The Hanfu-style clothing was prohibited and the people had to wear a short scarf and left-lapelled clothing; if they did not obey, they were put to death. The Jurchen queue and shaving hairstyle was not enforced on the Han Chinese in the Jin after an initial attempt to do so which was a rebuke to Jurchen values. However, the rules were not observed and the order was taken back under the Emperor Wanyan Liang who was Pro-Chinese allowing the Han Chinese to wear their Han clothing by lifting the ban in 1150 AD. After the occupation of the Northern Song territories by the Jurchens in 1127 AD, the Han Chinese who were living in Northern Song territories became the majority while the Jurchen became an ethnic minority; this led the Jurchens to make political concessions allowing the Han Chinese to practice Han Chinese culture. In 1138 AD, the Jin court adopted the Chinese robes for the emperor and the officials.

In 1161–1189 AD, many Jurchens appear to have begun adopting Han Chinese behavior and forgetting their own traditions and languages; therefore, the Emperor Shizong of Jin prohibited the Jurchens from dressing like the Han Chinese in 1191 AD as he wanted to revitalize the old Jurchen culture. However, despite his efforts, the influence of the Han Chinese living in the Northern Song territories had a significant influence and by the mid-twelve century, the Jurchens were sinicized so much that they were almost indistinguishable from the Han Chinese in terms of dress, literacy and social customs. Based on Han Chinese tombs of the Jin dynasty, it appears that ordinary Jurchen clothing may have been a symbol of lower class status as servants and lower-class women tend to be portrayed as wearing modified Jurchen-style clothing whereas women from the upper class wear Hanfu-style clothing. Yet despite the Han Chinese influence on Jurchens, travellers from the Southern Song dynasty who visited the former territories of the Song dynasty noted that there have been changes in the people's culture and that the Han Chinese's clothing style had also been influenced by the Jurchens in terms of adoption of items; they also noted that the only thing which had not changed much was the women's clothing style. However, the clothing-style of the Han Chinese women living the Jin dynasty was outdated compared to those living in the Southern Song territories. The yunjian was worn in the Jin dynasty and was adopted in the Yuan dynasty as a signature pattern on men's and women's clothing.

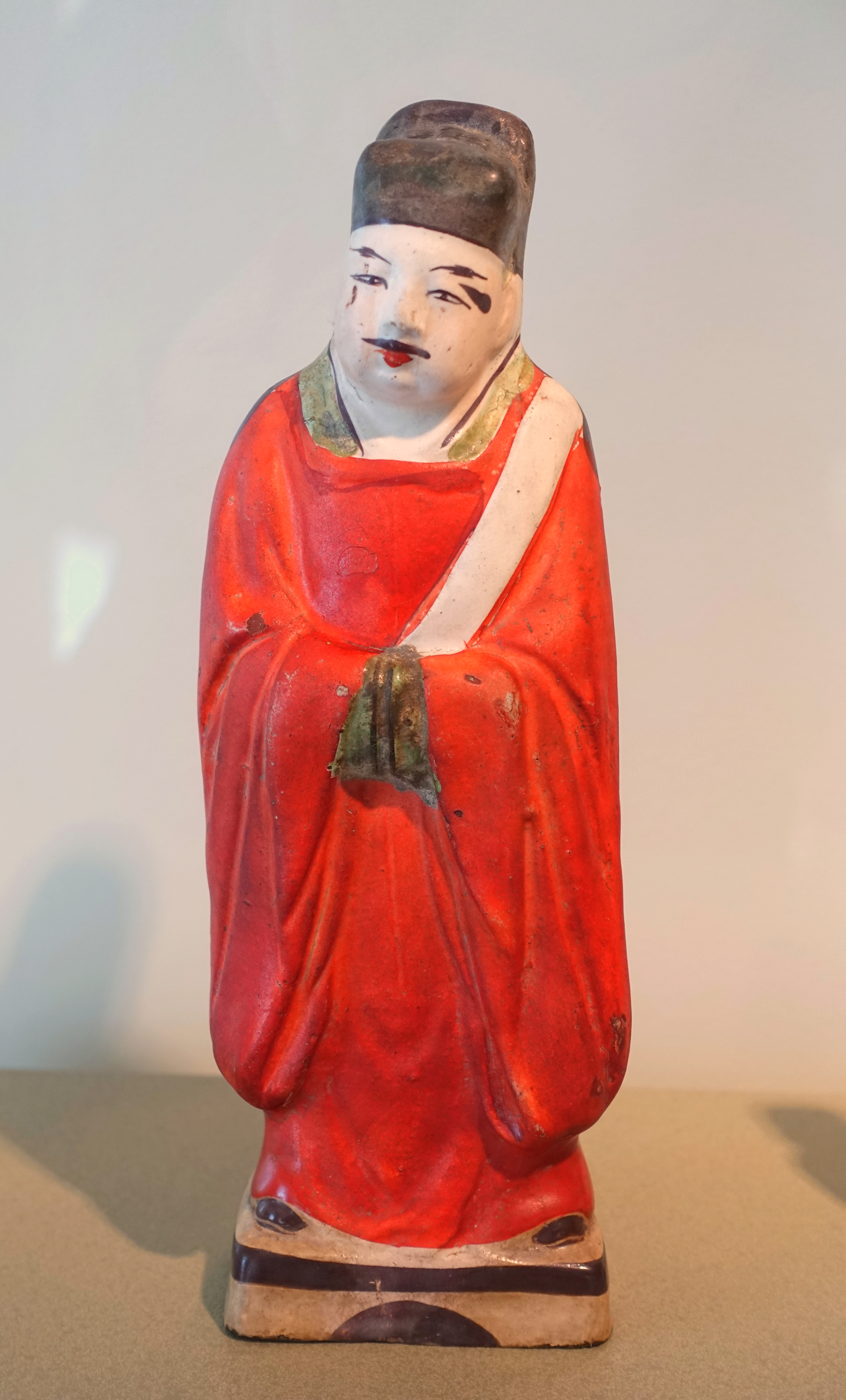
Standing official with tablet, China, possibly Handan, Hebei, Jin dynasty, early 1200s AD.

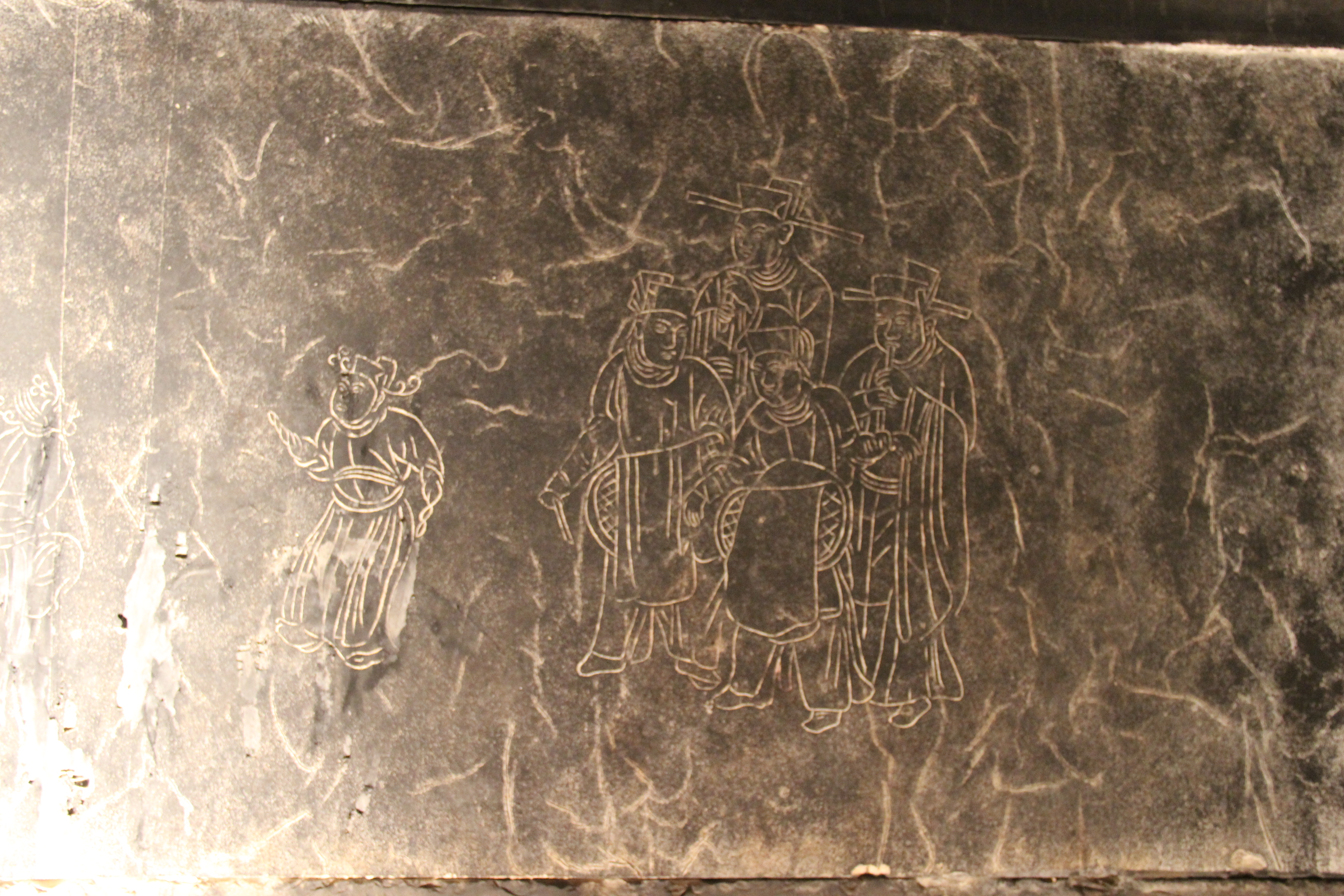
Jin Dynasty Tomb of Zou Fu, 1199 AD.

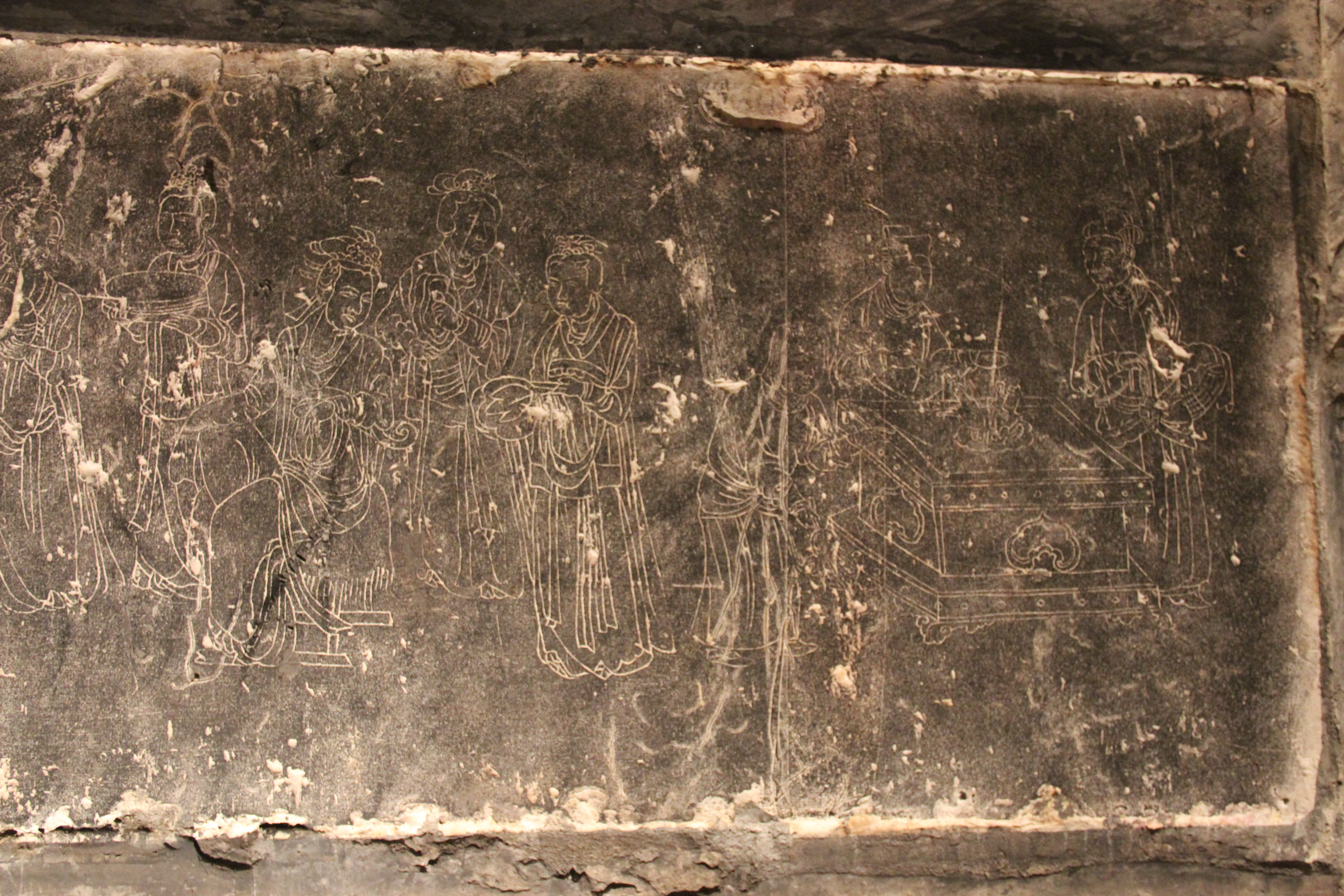
Jin Dynasty Tomb of Zou Fu, 1199 AD.

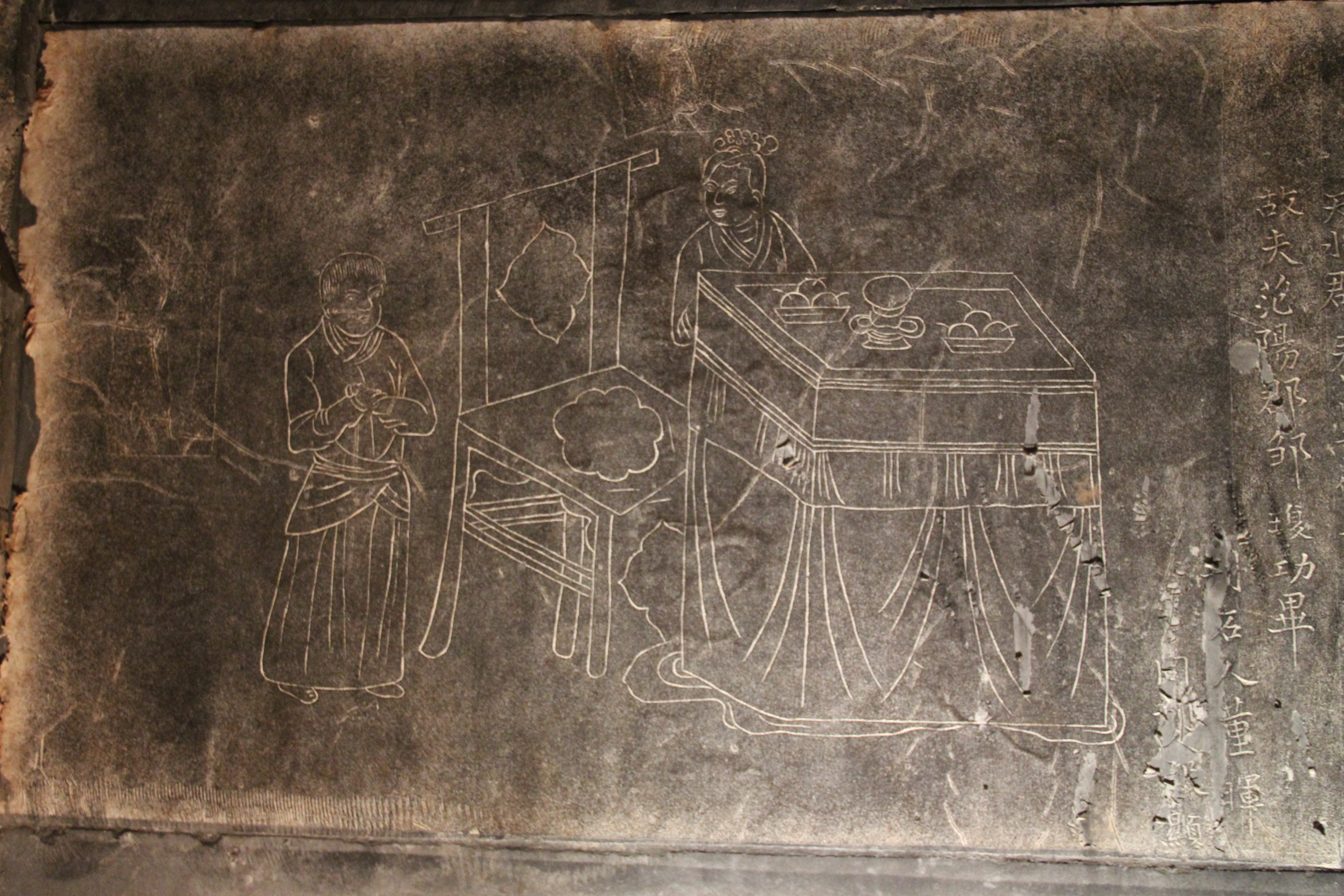
Jin Dynasty Tomb of Zou Fu

==== Western Xia ====
Emperor Jingzong, the first emperor of Western Xia, rejected Han Chinese silk clothing over the leather and wool clothing of the nomadic people from the Steppe; he argued that the Tanguts had traditionally worn leather-based and wool clothing and since the Tanguts men were military, they also had no use for silk materials. Yet, silk clothing was still worn in Western Xia during his reign. The Hanfu-style and the Tangut-style clothing were distinguished from each other, but both were used in the Western Xia. The Hanfu-style clothing was worn by officials whereas the Tangut-style clothing was worn by the military. Civil officials wore futou, boots, purple or crimson gown. Emperor Jingzong also ordered that every people in Western Xia must be shaved in an attempt to restore old Xianbei customs, and disobedience was death penalty. However, in 1061 AD, Emperor Yizong, the son of Emperor Jingzong, decided to replace Tangut clothing with Hanfu in his court. In his wish list to the Song dynasty court, Emperor Yizong asked permission to use Han Chinese rites and clothing to greet Song dynasty envoys and seek permission to buy Chinese official clothing; both of these requests were granted.

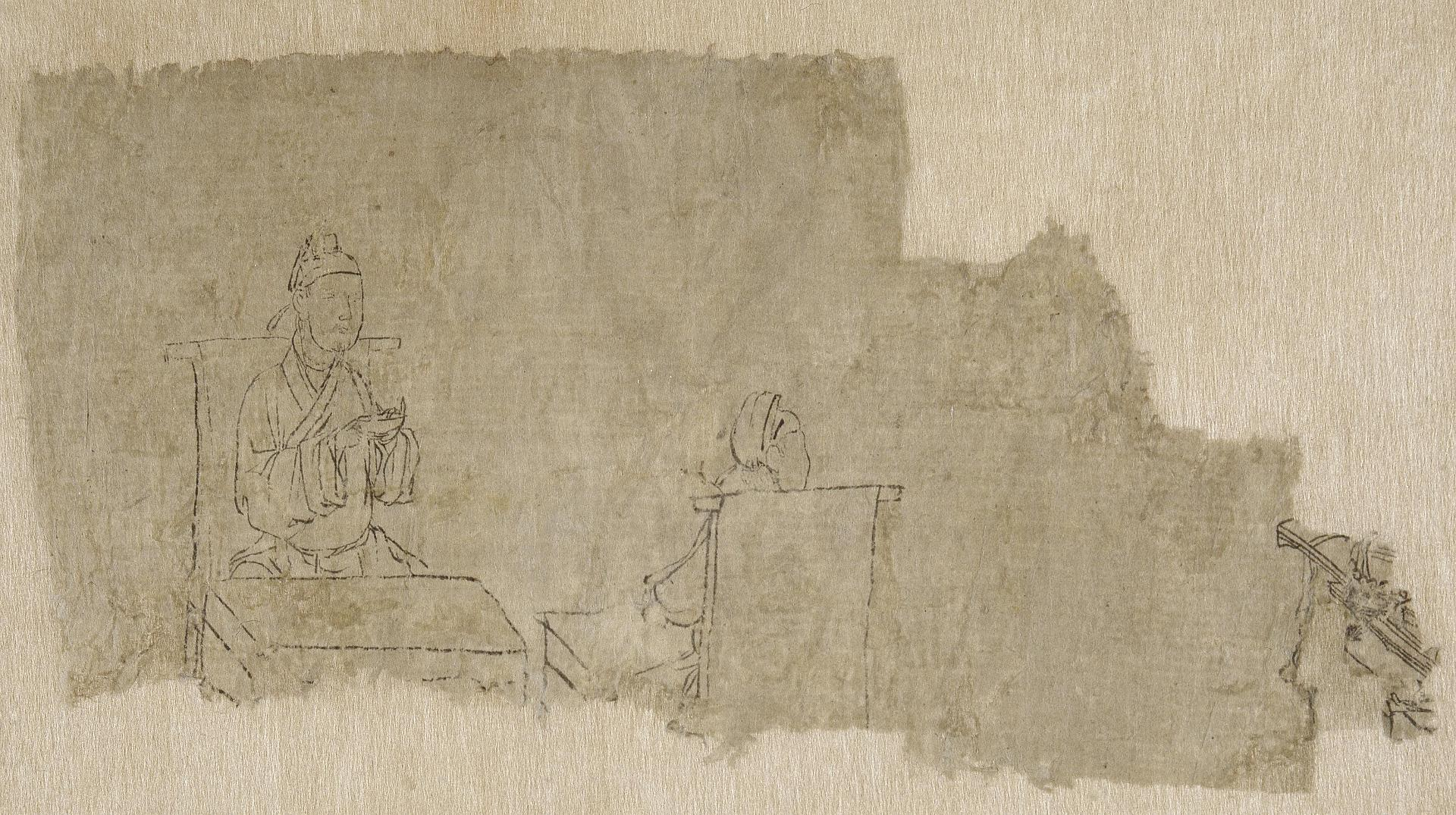
Sitting figures, Western Xia painting, 13th century.

Mural depicting men; Western Xia.

=== Yuan dynasty ===
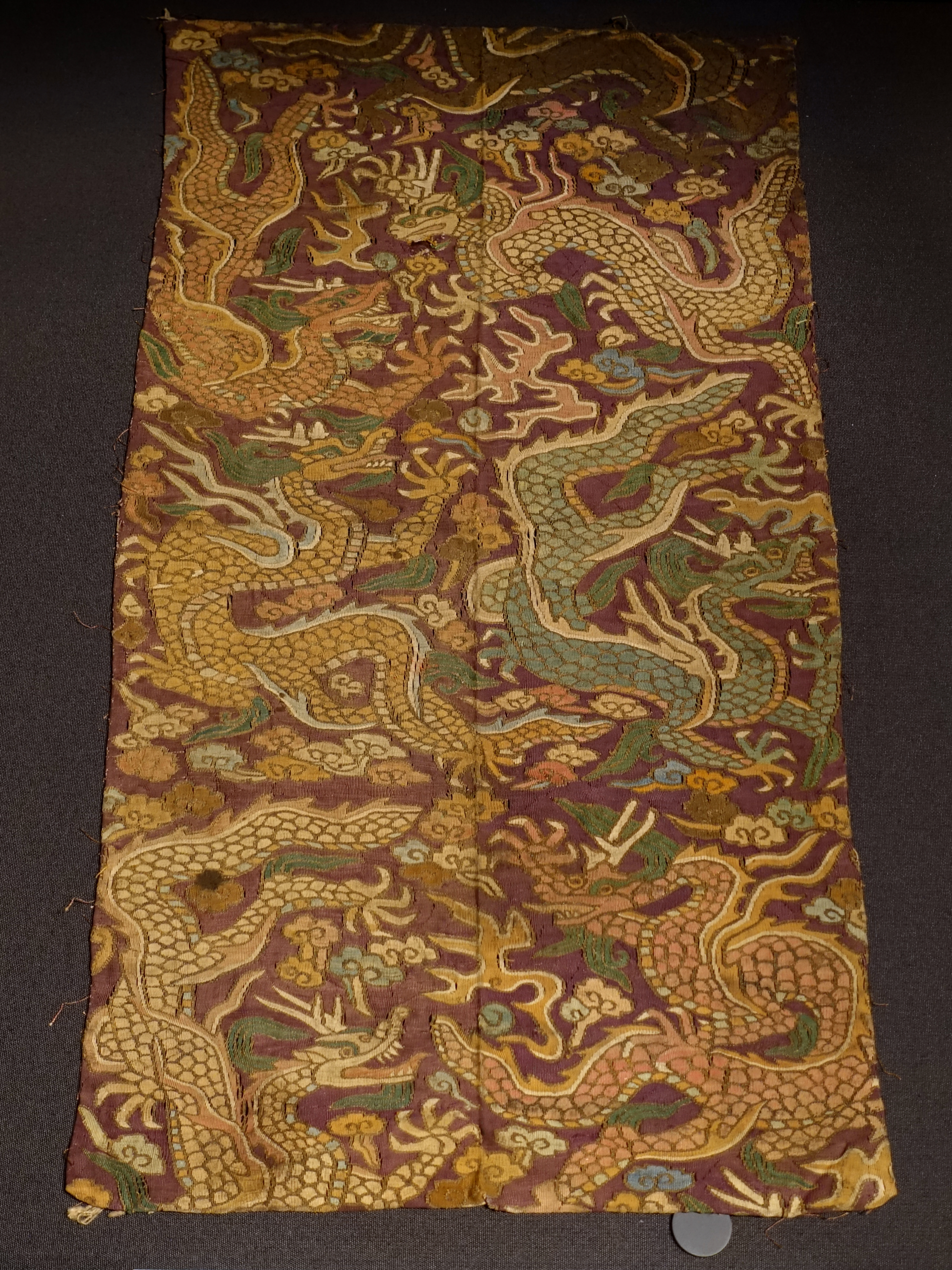
Textile with dragon design, 13th century. Dragon and phoenix motifs were strictly reserved for the top members of the Imperial family throughout China's history.

During the Yuan dynasty, Mongol dress was the clothing of elite for both genders. The Mongol attire for both men and women worn in the 13th-14th century was completely different from the Hanfu which had been worn in the Tang dynasty and Song dynasty. The Mongol attire was shared by people of different social ranking due to its practicality which contrasted with the dress code of the Han Chinese; as such, Mongol attire was popular. The Mongols never imposed Mongol customs on the Han Chinese.

Many Han Chinese and other ethnicities readily adopted Mongol clothing in Northern China to show their allegiance to the Mongols; however, in Southern China, Mongol clothing was rarely seen as both men and women continued to dress in Song-style garments. In the tomb of a woman from a Southern Song site, dating from the late-Yuan dynasty in Fuzhou, Fujian, the two-pieces system of Southern Song clothing (i.e., ruqun) has been found instead of the Mongol women's one-piece robe. Burial clothing and tomb paintings in the southern territories of the Yuan dynasty also show that women wore the Song-style attire, which looked slimmer when compared to the Mongol court robe. The Song-style clothing is also depicted as consisting of jackets, which were open in the front and had long, narrow and thin sleeves, and sometimes women are depicted as wearing a sleeveless vest-type jackets with front openings. For example, in the Yuan dynasty mural paintings from Dongercun from 1269 AD in Shaanxi and in the mural painting in tomb M2 at Kangzhuangcun in Tunliu from 1276 AD, maids and servants are seen wearing Song-style attire.

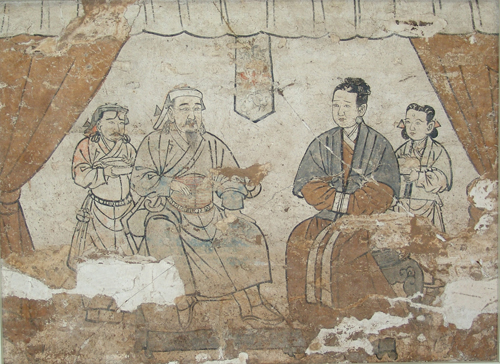
Chinese tomb occupants wearing Mongol-style clothing. The female tomb occupant is depicted wearing the woman's red Mongol robe under a short overjacket but does not wear the gugu hat, Shazishan Tomb Fresco, Yuan dynasty.

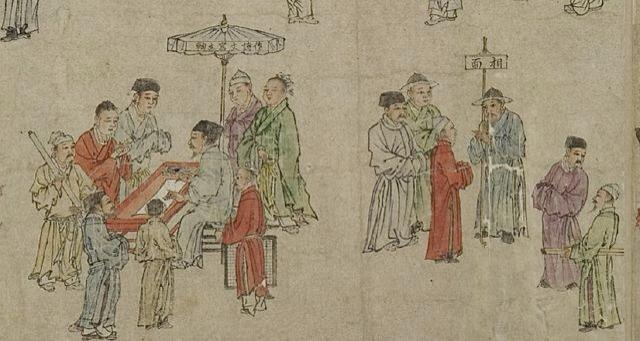
People in Hanfu

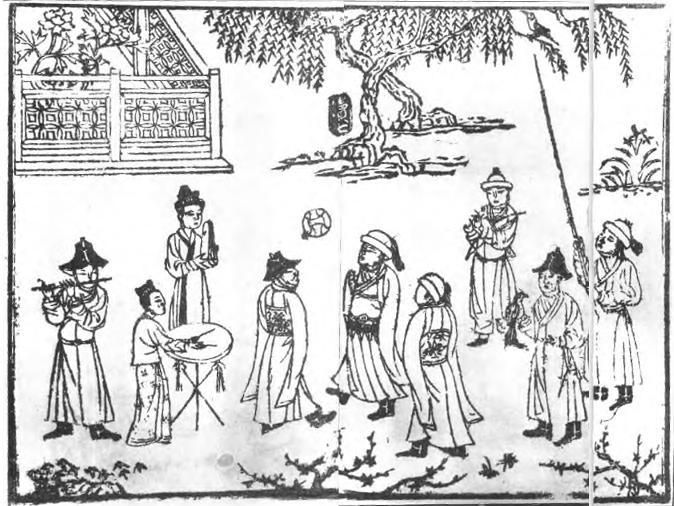
Yuan dynasty illustration of people wearing hanfu and playing Cuju (from the Shilin Guangji by Chen Yuanjing)

The type of clothing worn in the Yuan dynasty may have also served as a political statement; for example, despite not being the clothing of the ruling elite, the Tang-Song style clothing worn in multiple layers continued to be worn by families who showed that they were resisting the rule of the Mongols. A form of skirts worn in the Yuan dynasty is a skirt which consist of two parts sewn to a separate single waistband which may also be pleated.

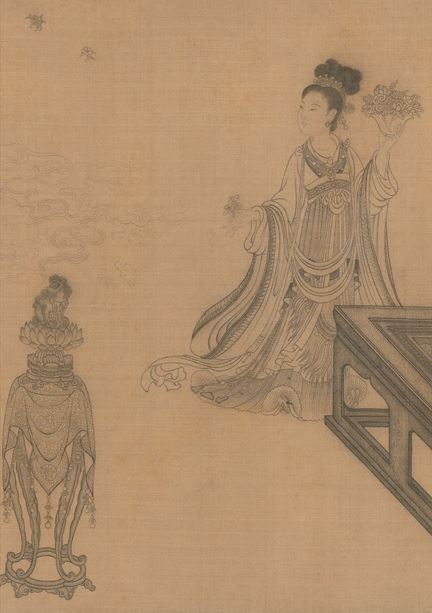
A female figure from Vimalakirti and the Doctrine of Nonduality, Yuan dynasty.

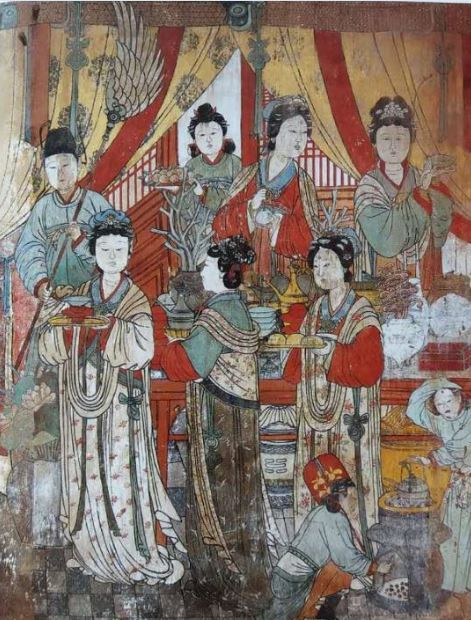
Fresco in the Hall of King Ming-ying, Hung-t'ung County, Yuan dynasty painting.

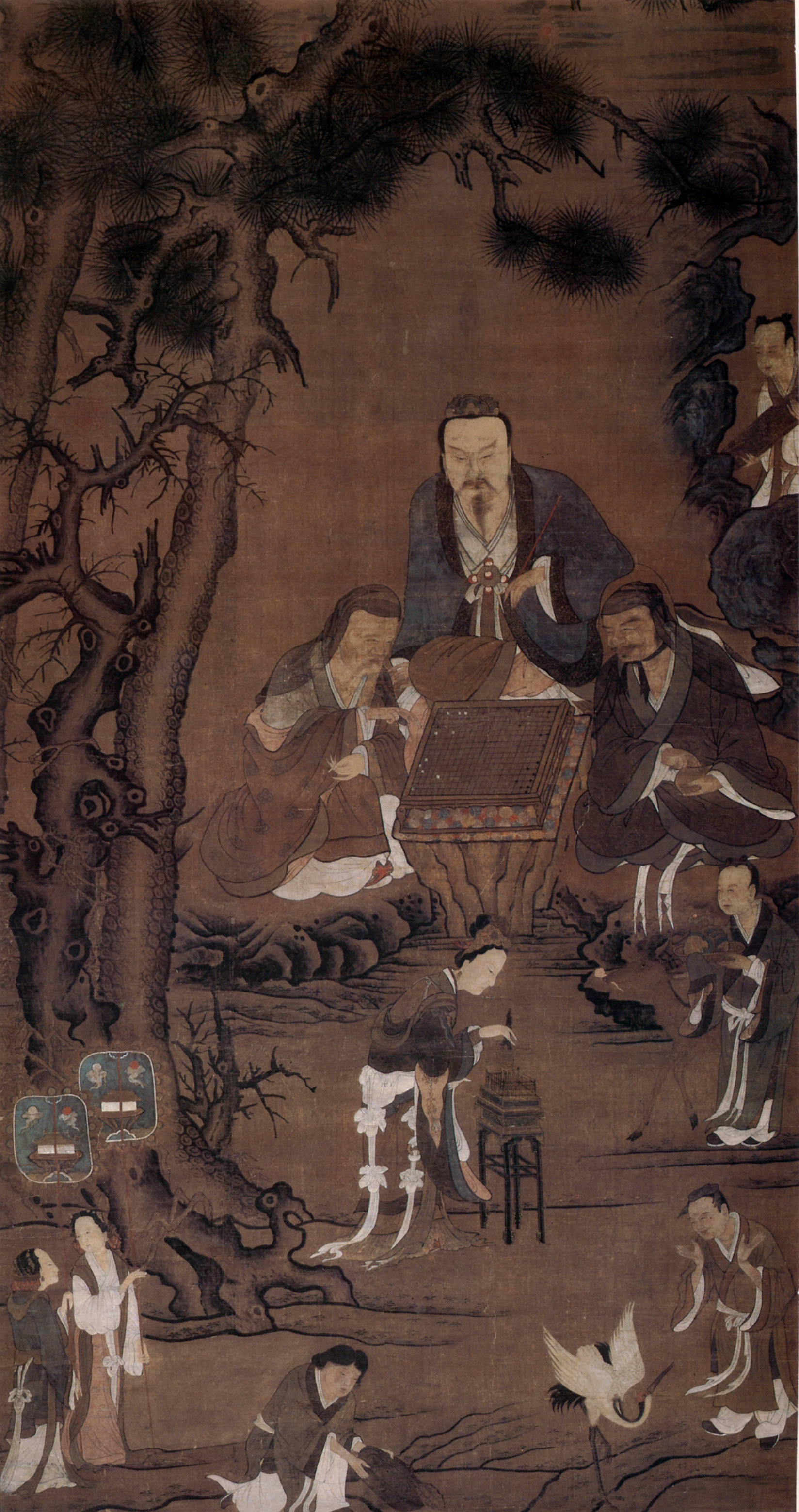
Three Daoist Figures Playing the Game of Go by Zhushi

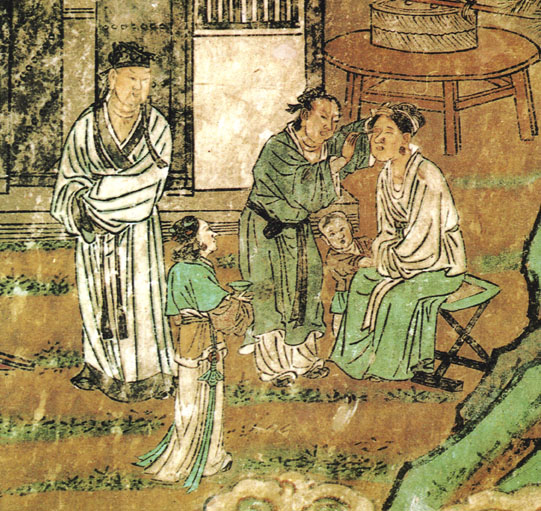
Yuan Daoist Temple Mural

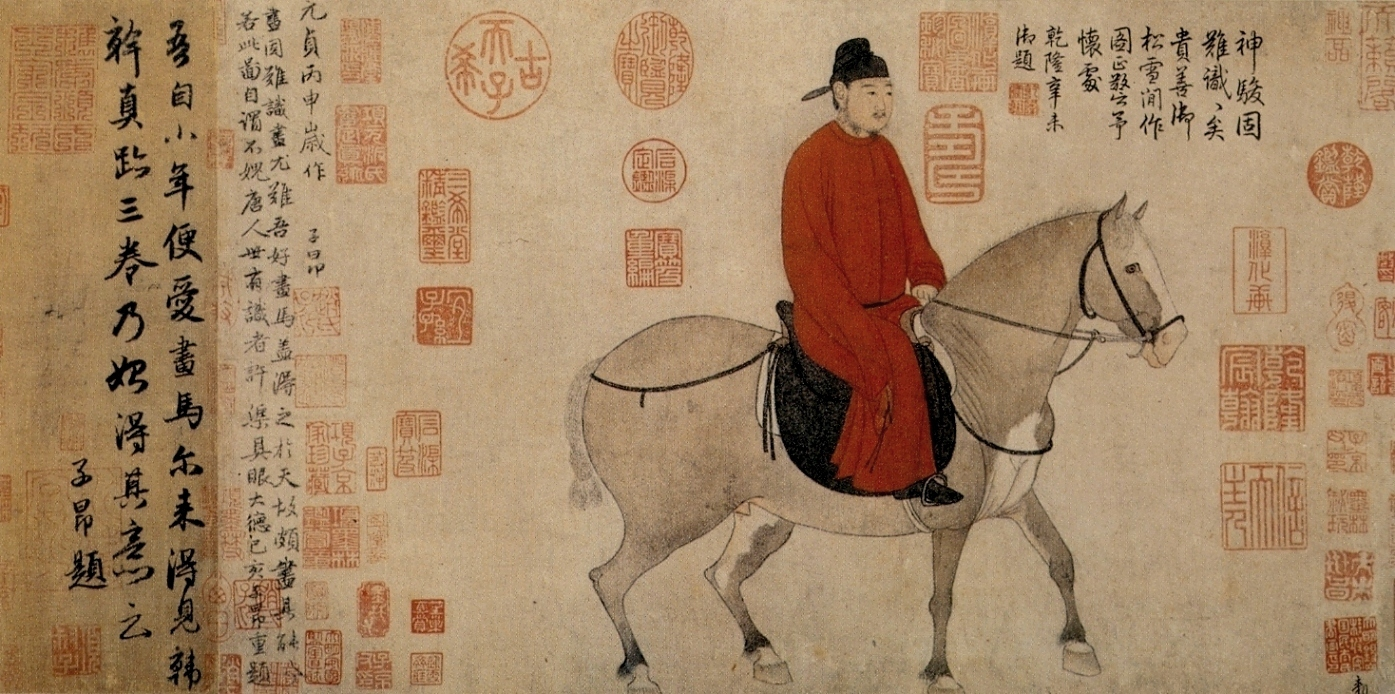
Man Riding a Horse in a round-collared gown, Yuan dynasty painting by Zhao Mengfu, dated 1296 AD.

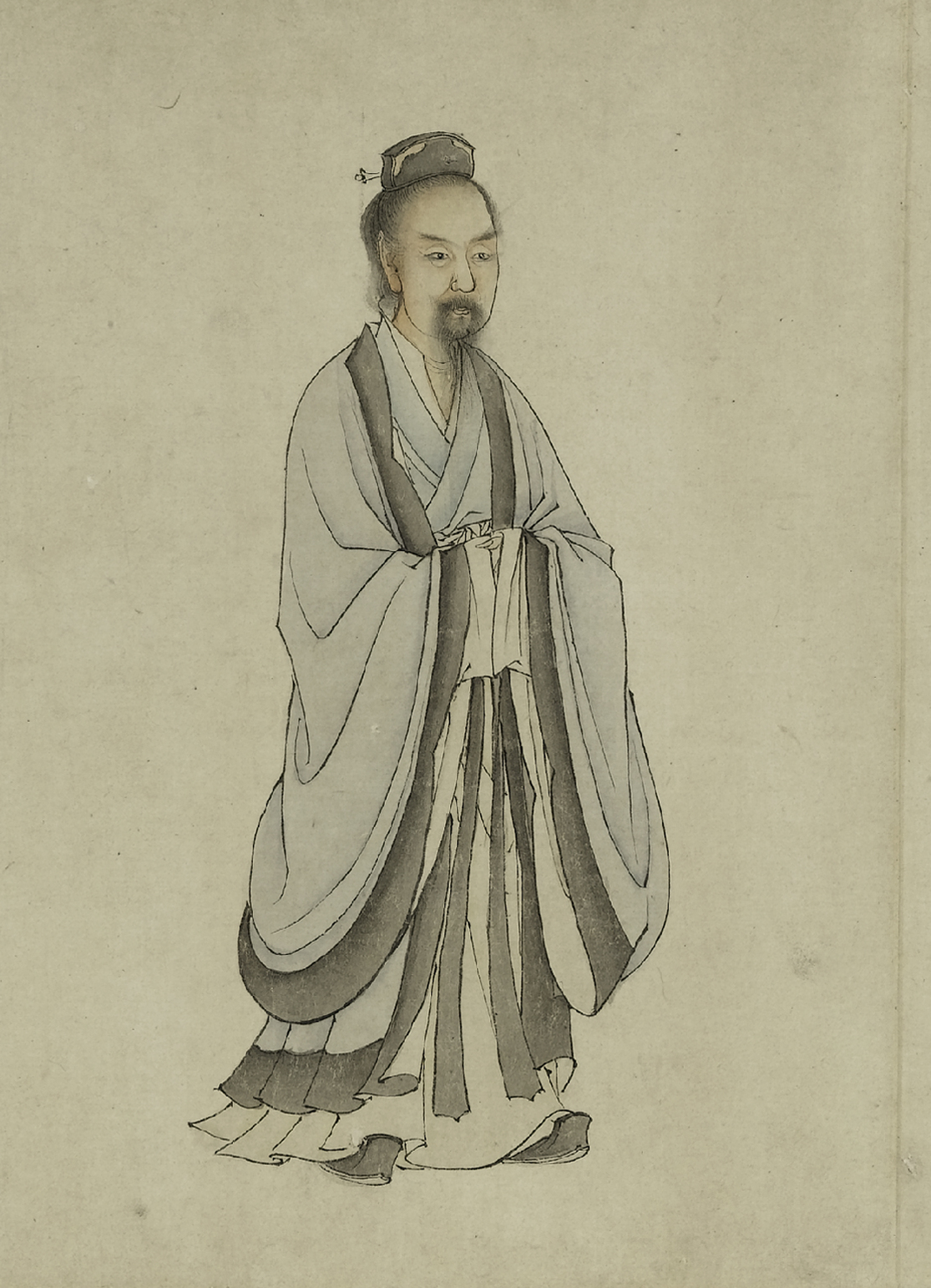
Portrait of Yin Wen, dated 1326, Yuan dynasty.

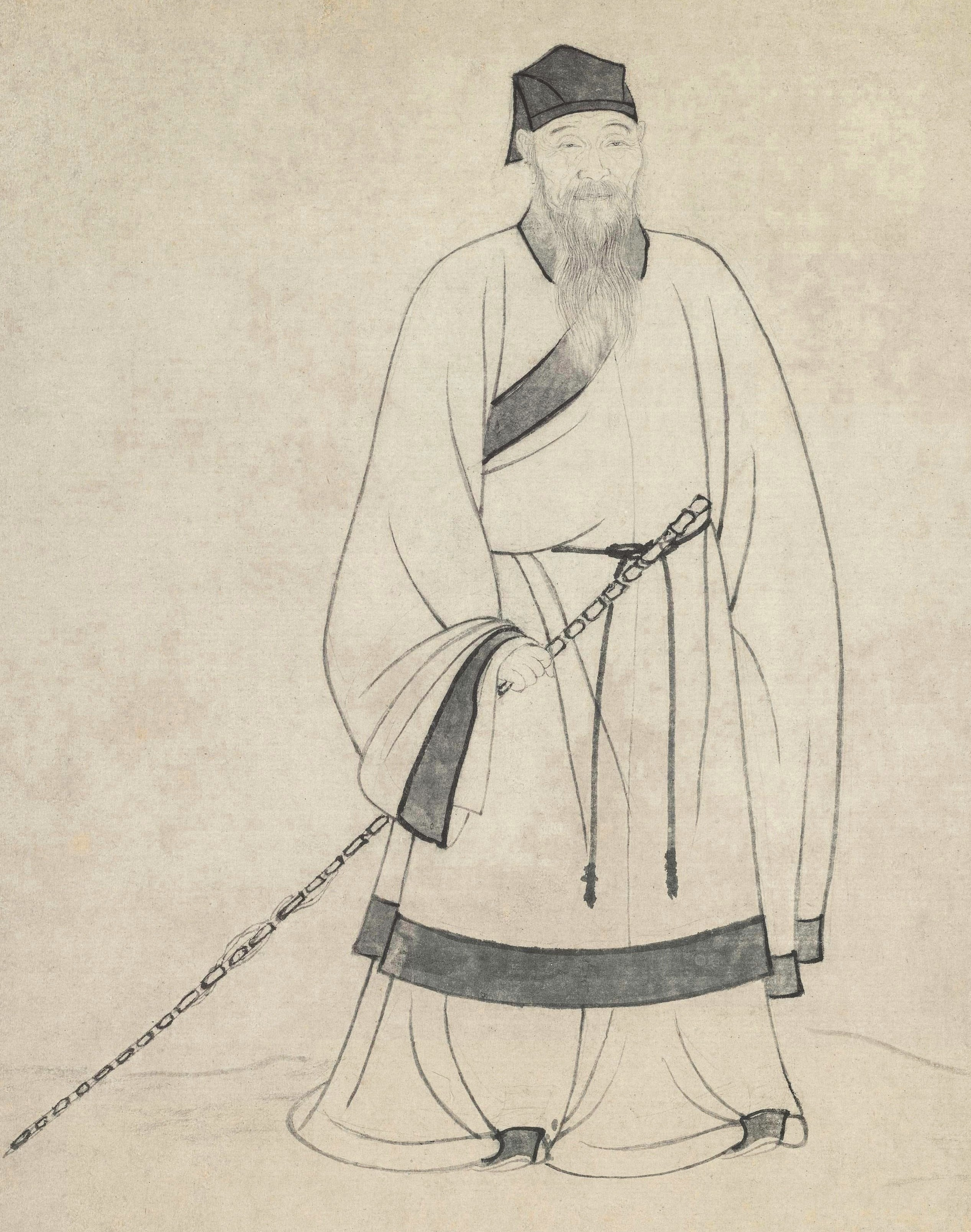
Portrait of Yang Zhuxi, dated 1363, Yuan dynasty.

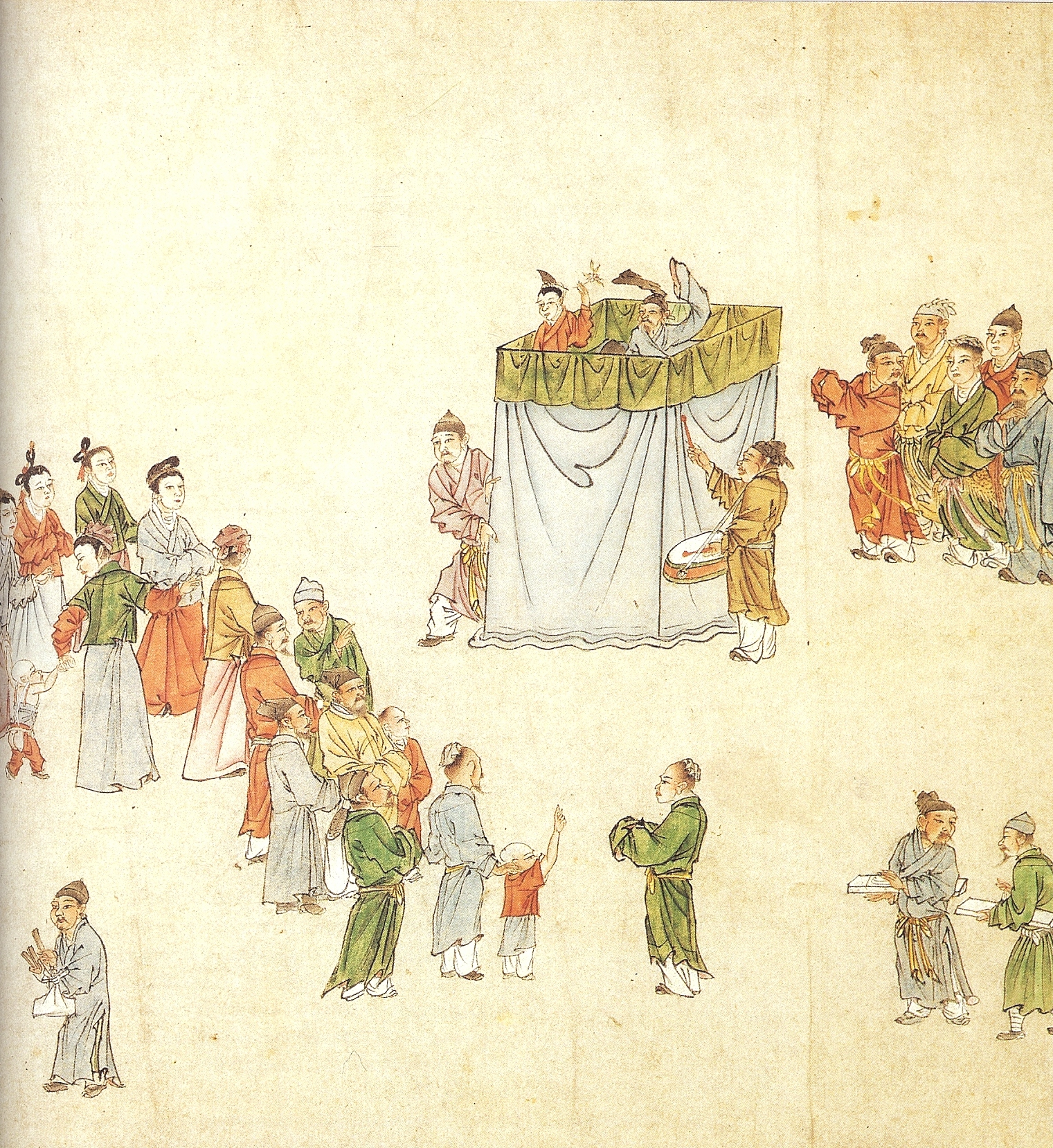
Puppeteers draw a crowd, Yuan Dynasty, 14th century AD.

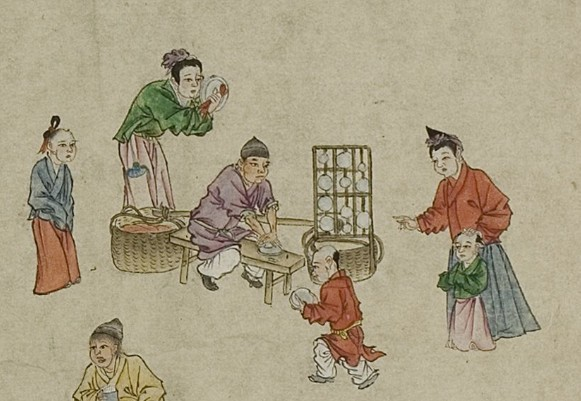

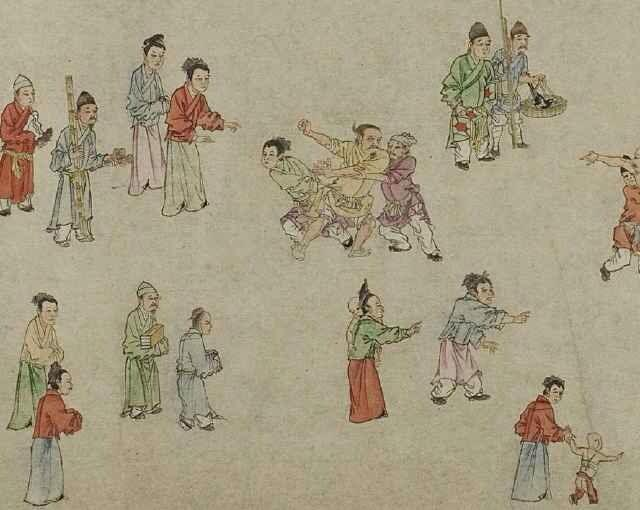

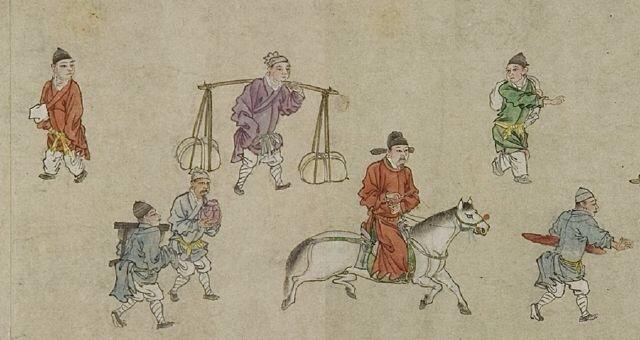

=== Ming dynasty ===
==== Ban of hufu, return to hanfu, and cultural integration ====
The Ming dynasty had many Mongol clothes and cultural aspects abolished and enforced Tang dynasty style Han Chinese clothing.

As soon as the Hongwu Emperor conquered the Yuan dynasty, he decried the "barbarian customs" of the Yuan dynasty and how people imitated the Mongols for personal gains; and so, he called for the restoration of Han Chinese traditions, which included the proper forms of dress, hairstyles, and attires. According to the Veritable Records of Hongwu Emperor (太祖實錄), a detailed official account of daily activities of Hongwu Emperor written by court historians, he restored the entire clothing system to the standard of the Tang dynasty shortly after the founding of Ming dynasty:

洪武元年二月壬子...至是，悉命復衣冠如唐制，士民皆束髮於頂，官則烏紗帽，圓領袍，束帶，黑靴。

[On the Renzi day in the second month of the first year of Hongwu era (29 February 1368 CE), Hongwu emperor decreed that all fashions of clothing and headwear shall be restored to the standard of Tang, all citizens shall gather their hairs on top of their heads, and officials shall wear the wushamao (black-cloth hats), round-collar robes, belts, and black boots.]

— Veritable Records of Hongwu Emperor (太祖實錄)

The attempt was to signified the Han Chinese cultural identity after defeating the Yuan dynasty. The new clothing system that the Hongwu Emperor formulated was based on the dress code of the previous dynasties, which included the dress codes of the Zhou, Han, Tang, and Song dynasties. He also promulgated several decrees to ban Mongol and nomadic clothing style. However, fashionable Mongol attire, items and hats were still sometimes worn by early Ming royals, such as Hongwu Emperor himself and Zhengde Emperor. Thus, many Ming dynasty clothing styles absorbed elements of both Han Chinese and Mongol clothing.

The Ming dynasty developed a new attire from Yuan dynasty's terlig: tieli; it is a cross-collared, long sleeved robe with dense and narrow pleats all around the lower hem. The tieli was mainly worn by the upper class and rarely worn by the lower class. In the Veritable Records of the Joseon Dynasty, tieli were recorded as ch'obli (帖裡), bestowed as present by the Ming dynasty from the year 1424; however, the terlig-style attires found in both countries differed from each other in terms of form and historical development. The jisün that had been popular in the Yuan dynasty was also worn by the court bodyguards, the xiaowei (校尉; guards of honour), the brocade guards, and by court servants. The yesa robe, which mixed Han and Mongol elements was worn as an informal attire by emperors, princes, ministers, and officials in early Ming dynasty; it was worn as a formal uniforms during the middle period of the Ming dynasty; it was worn as a casual dress worn by scholar-officials during the mid-to-late period of the Ming dynasty; and eventually it was worn by Ming court eunuchs, servants and commoners in the late Ming.

The boli hat worn by the Mongols in the Yuan dynasty influenced the Han Chinese and continued to be used widely in the Ming dynasty in the form of the damao, which was worn by the government clerks and family servants. The use of the damao by the family servants of the Ming officials and the imperial family contributed popularity spread of that hat which eventually become a symbol of low-ranking servants.

Other new Ming dynasty attires influenced by the Yuan dynasty include the buttoned jackets known as bijia (比甲) or zhaojia (罩甲), small hat (小帽; xiaomao) or liuheyitong mao (六合一統帽), and the dahu. Archeological evidence from the tombs of Ming dynasty princes show that the Mongol-style attire continued to exist well until the 15th century. The Ming dynasty also adopted humao, and a waistcoat with buttons at the front from Yuan dynasty.

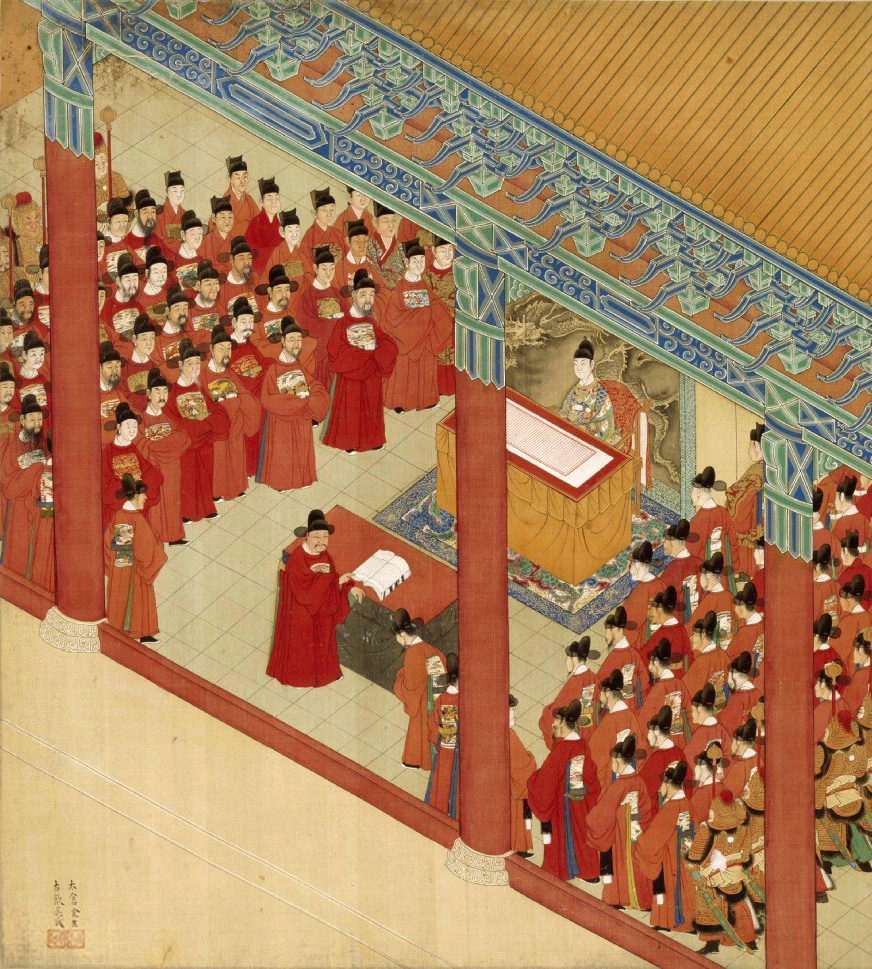
A gathering of government officials in Changfu in front of the emperor.

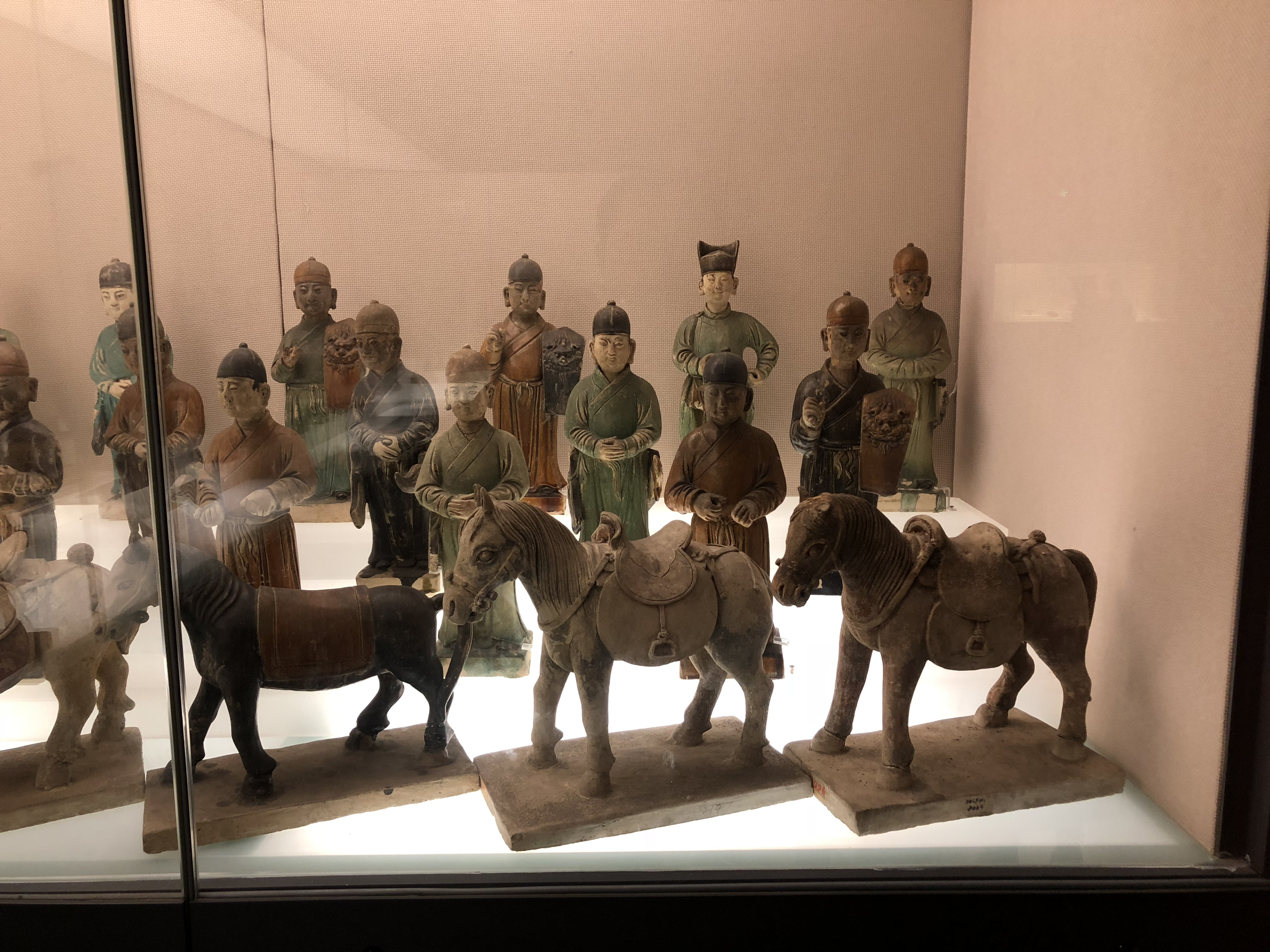
Ming tomb figurines

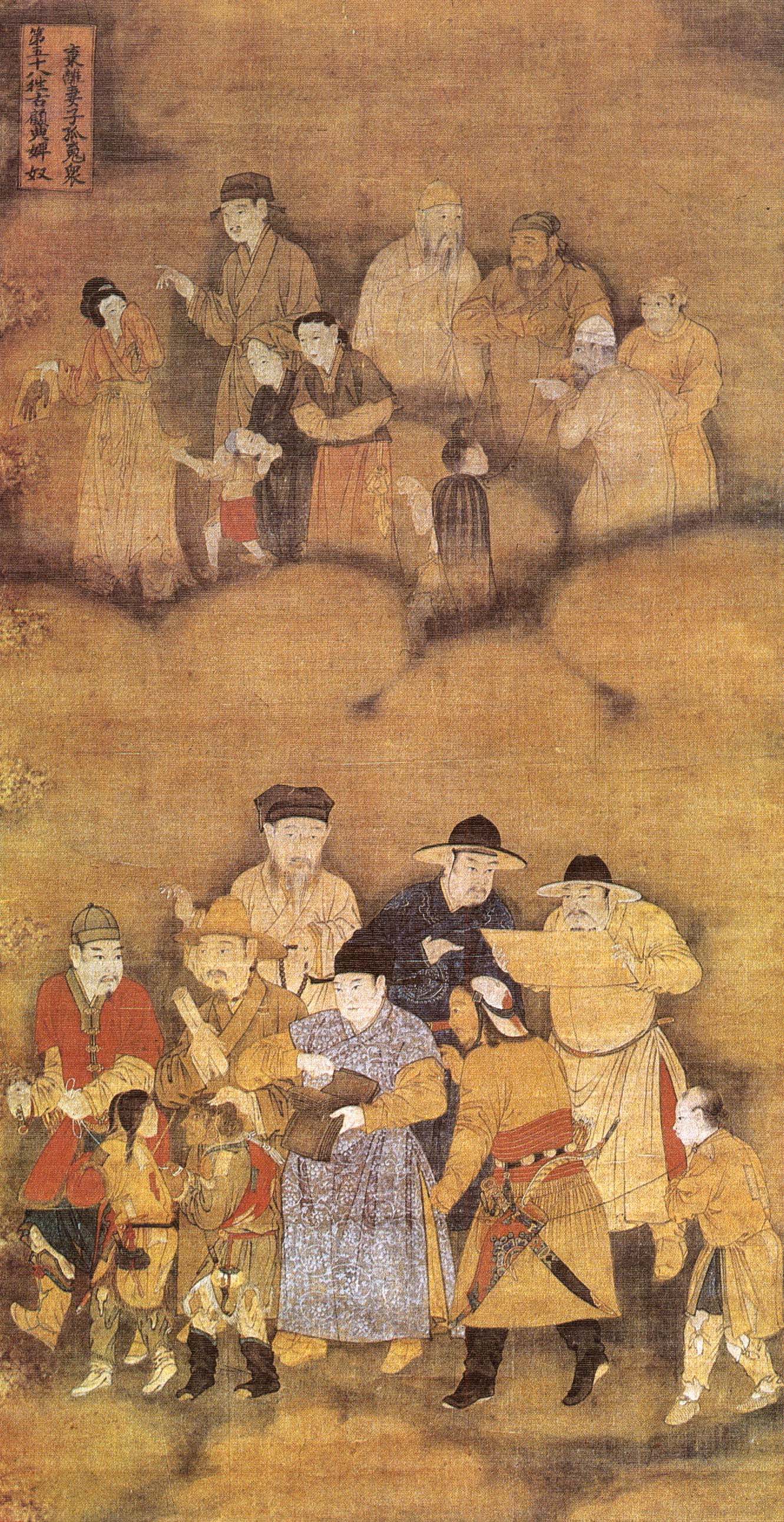
Ming dynasty painting depicting Han Chinese clothing and Mongolian-style clothing, unknown author

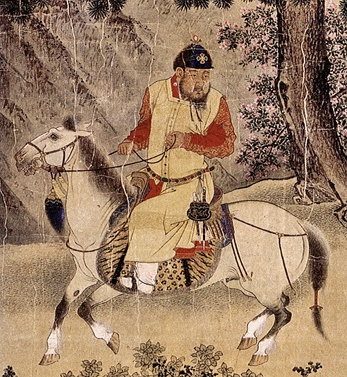
Emperor Xuande wearing a buttoned hunting jacket, or zhaojia (罩甲).

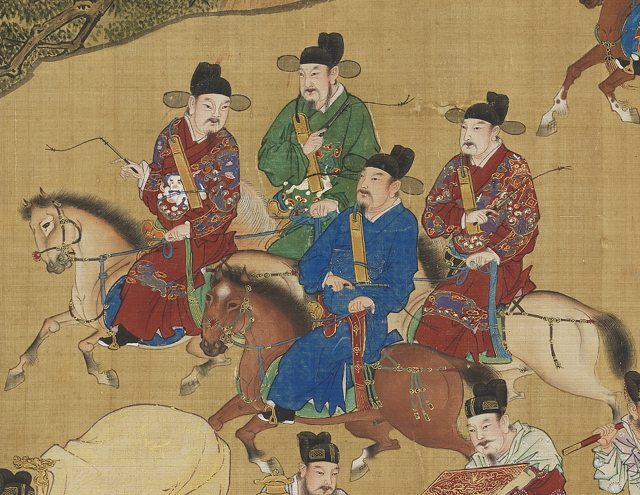
Ming dynasty officials wearing yesa robes.

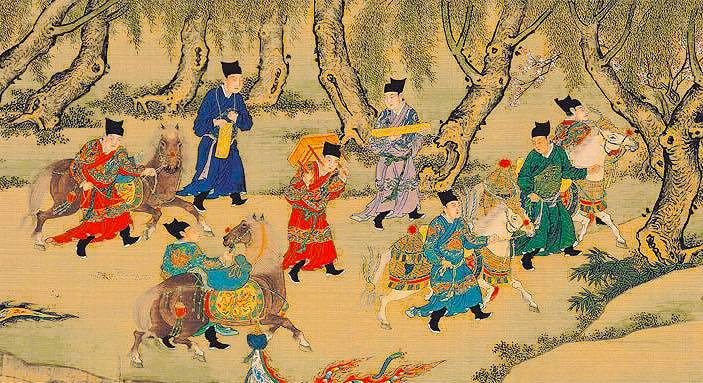
The Jinyiwei, also known "Brocade-clad guards", dressed in their uniforms (jisün and feiyufu) to guard the Emperor's treasures, Ming dynasty.

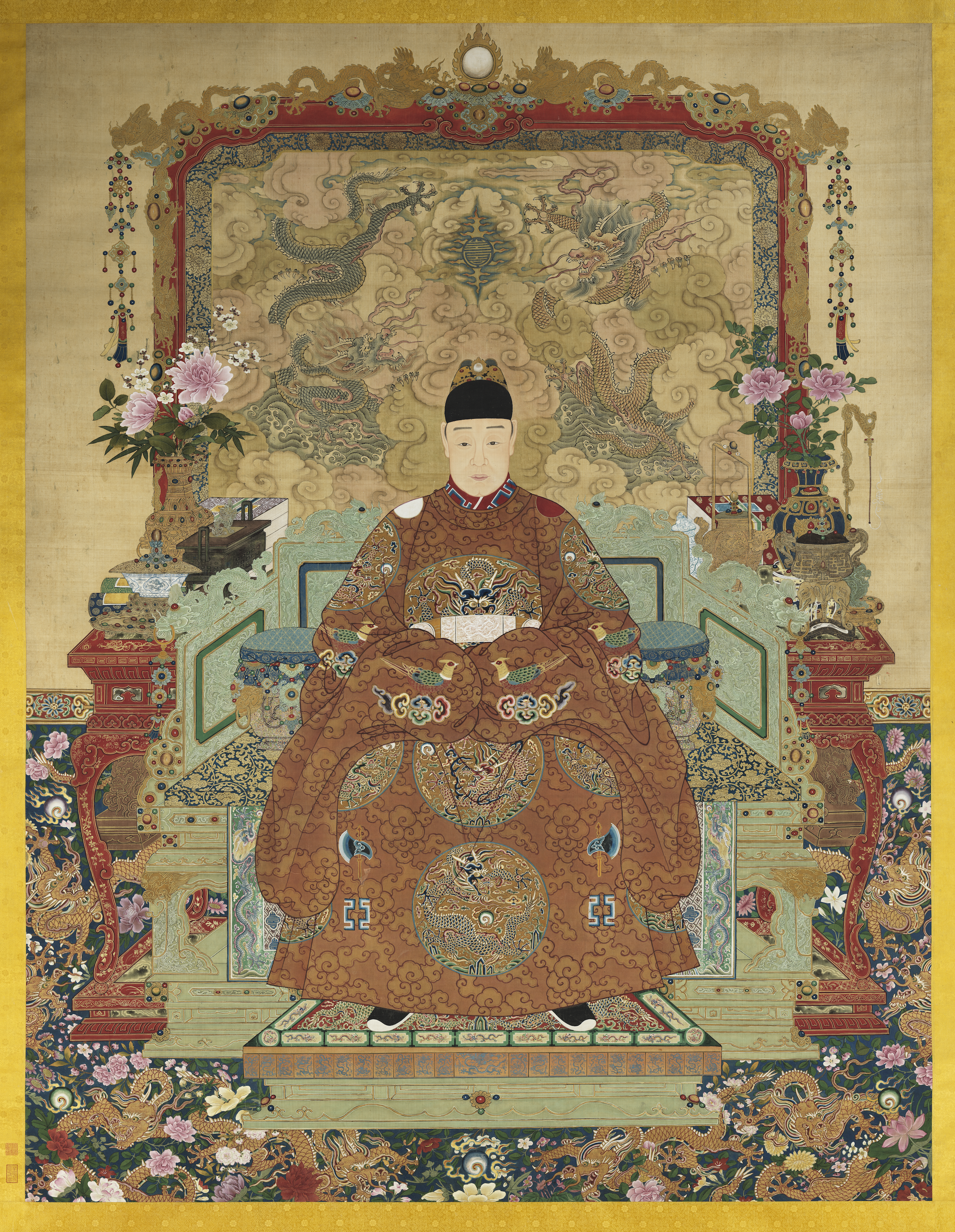
The Tianqi Emperor in court dress

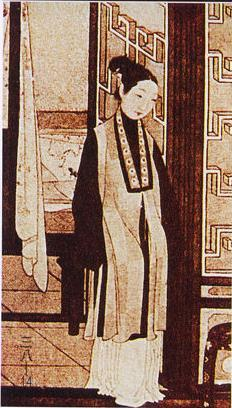
Lady wearing a bijia, which extends down the knees, Ming dynasty

==== Establishing new dress regulations ====
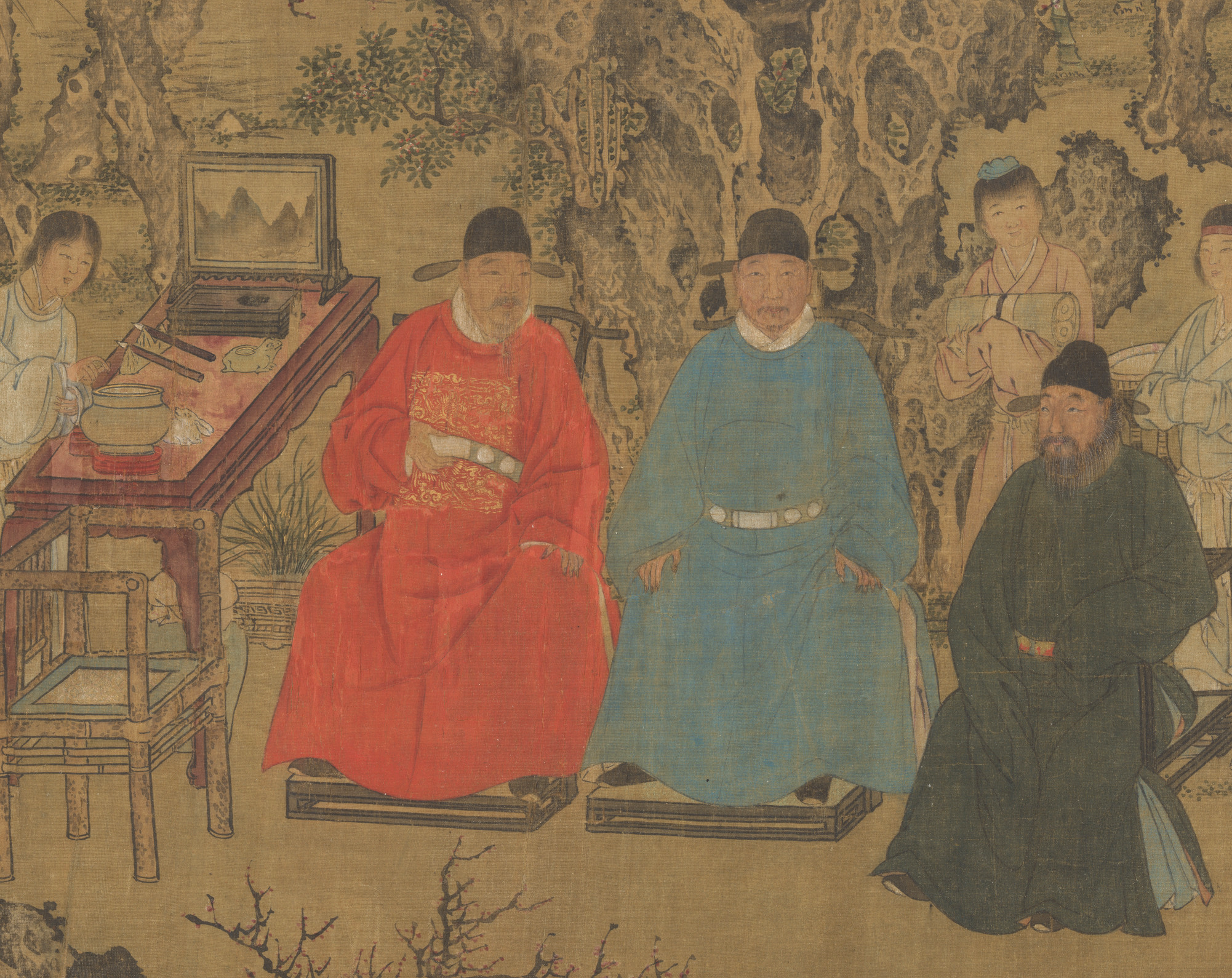
Early Ming dynasty officials of the 1300-1400s, as painted by Xie Huan.

The founder of the Ming dynasty, the Hongwu Emperor, saw the fundamentality of making a new dress code to consolidate his rule; he spent almost all his reigning years developing and institutionalizing dressing regulations, which were recorded in various compilation of texts, such as the Collected Statutes of the Ming Dynasty. The dressing regulations were based on the dressing system of the Tang and Song dynasties. Moreover, the Ming dynasty dressing regulations were strongly related to the ritual system; the Confucian codes and ideals that were popularized during the Ming dynasty also had a significant effect on those regulations. The dressing regulations determined what attire and ornaments could be worn depending on one's social ranks. For example, the Ming dynasty's basic dressing principles, announced in 1392, included the following:

Officials' robes should fit their bodies. The length of those worn by civil officials is one inch from the ground. The sleeves should be long enough to reach the elbows when they are folded back from the end of the hands; they should be one foot wide, with cuffs of nine inches wide. The sizes of nobles (gonghou), and imperial sons-in-law's robes are the same as civil officials’. So are the sizes of seniors and primary degree holders’ robe, except for the sleeves, which are three inches from the elbow when folded from the hands. A commoners’ robe is five inches from the ground. So is a military official's; their sleeves should be seven inches over their hands, with cuffs as broad as their fists. Soldiers’ clothes are seven inches from the ground, with sleeves five inches longer than their hands, and seven inches wide. Their cuffs are wide enough only for their fists to stretch out[.]

In the Ming dynasty, the inner garment that people wore were called neidan (内单). The fabric material of the outer garment are determined by one's social status. The emperors tend to wear yellow satin gown with dragon designs, jade belts, and yishanguan (翼善冠; philanthropy crown, with wings folded upwards). The yishanguan were only worn by emperors and other members of the royal family on formal occasions. Officials wore different wore robes of various colours and patterns; they also wore gauze hats. Civil and military officials wore different types of guanfu (官服), depending on occasions and events: chaofu (朝服; court dress), the jifu (祭服; sacrificial ceremony dress), the gongfu (公服; public service dress), the changfu (常服; everyday dress), and the yanfu (燕服; casual or leisure clothing). The officials' robes are usually patched with embroidered square pattern of animals on the back and the front; the patches are called the Mandarin square, and were differentiated between officials' ranks. Minor differences can be observed between the Mandarin squares decreed by the Hongwu Emperor and the Jiajing Emperor.

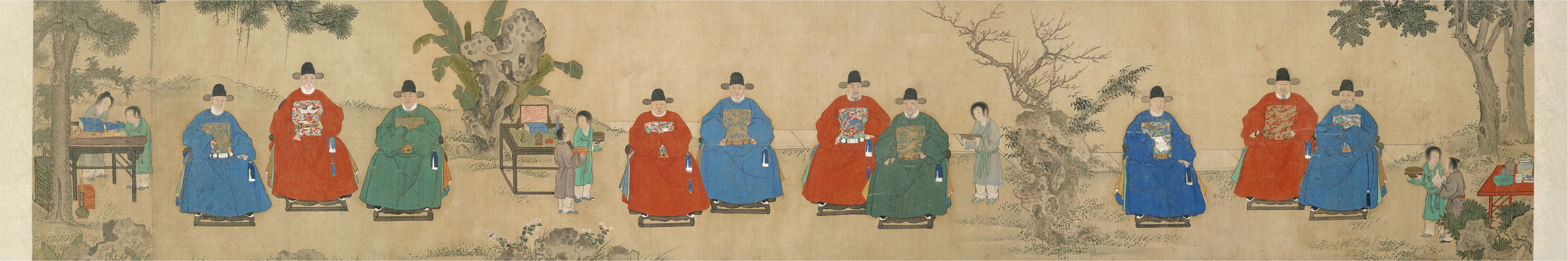
Ten Officials Who Passed the Imperial Examination in the Same Year of 1464 (甲申十同年圖), painted in 1503 during one of their reunions. The presence of yapai (牙牌; lit. 'Tusk Card'; the rectangular ornaments, that hanged from each official's left waist, are ivory plaques that engraved with the wearer's department, position, rank and instructions; Yapai were visitor's badge that granted passage into the Forbidden City for officials to have an audience with the emperor) implies that this scene was painted shortly after a court meeting. During the Ming dynasty, both civil and military officials were divided into nine Ranks (品), each Rank was further subdivided into Primary (正) and Secondary (從) so there were technically eighteen Ranks, with First Rank Primary (正一品) being the highest and the Ninth Rank Secondary (從九品) the lowest. Officials of the upper four Ranks (from First Rank Primary to Fourth Rank Secondary) were entitled to wear the red robes; mid-Ranks (Fifth Rank Primary to Seventh Rank Secondary) to wear blue robes and the lower Ranks (Eighth Rank Primary to Ninth Rank Secondary) to wear green robes. In addition, each exact Rank was indicated by a picture of unique animal (either real or legendary) sewn in a Mandarin square on both the front and back of the robe, so fellow officials could identify someone's Rank from afar.

The Ming dynasty empresses appeared to be wearing similar dress as their Song dynasty counterparts. The queens wore crown with decorations of dragons and phoenixes, and wore a red large-sleeves upper garments also decorated with dragon and phoenixes. The dressing of officials' wives and mothers who were bestowed the title of "appointed lady" (mingfu; 命妇) were also strictly regulated. The Emperors could bestow special types of robes to people that he favoured, such as the mangfu, the douniufu (斗牛服; "fighting bull" robe; the "fighting bull" is a two-horned dragon-like creature), and the feiyufu. The illegal use and production of those special robes were prohibited by imperial decree and could result to severe punishment or death.

The Jiajing Emperor was the last ruler of the Ming dynasty; he made significant changes to the Ming dynasty dressing code to consolidate his imperial authority. The Jiajing Emperor was very focused in reforming the yanfu (燕服; casual or leisure clothing), as he found his own yanfu too vulgar and too common to befit his imperial status. At the end of 1528 AD, yanfu's new statutes, adjusted from the ancient xuanduan, were decreed. The yanbian guanfu (燕弁冠服; "Dress of the Casual Hat"), designed for the emperor, was in colour black bordered with a green trim and featured 143 dragons, with a dragon medallion on the front of the clothing. The zhongjing guanfu (忠靜冠服 or 忠靖冠服; "Dress of Loyalty and Tranquility"), designed for the ranked officials, was dark green in colour; while cloud patterns were granted to the robe for third-rank and above officials, fourth-rank and below officials had to wear plain robes. The baohe guanfu (保和冠服; "Dress of Preserving Harmony"), designed for the royal princes), was in colour green and bordered with a green trim, and had two rank badges that showed dragon designs.

The shenyi suddenly made a comeback among Han Chinese and became the formal scholar official robe when the Ming dynasty was founded in 1368 AD. The scholar officials wore chengziyi (程子衣) as leisure clothing. Hats worn by the scholars and literati were: the sifang pingding jin (四方平定巾; flat-top square hat), the dongpo jin (東坡巾; "Dongpo hat"), and the fangjin (方巾). The daopao was worn as a casual dress by all levels of society, including the External officials and eunuchs. The zhishen was also worn by eunuchs sometimes to show their superiority. Commoner men usually wore plain-coloured clothing while commoner women wore upper garments and skirts of light colours.

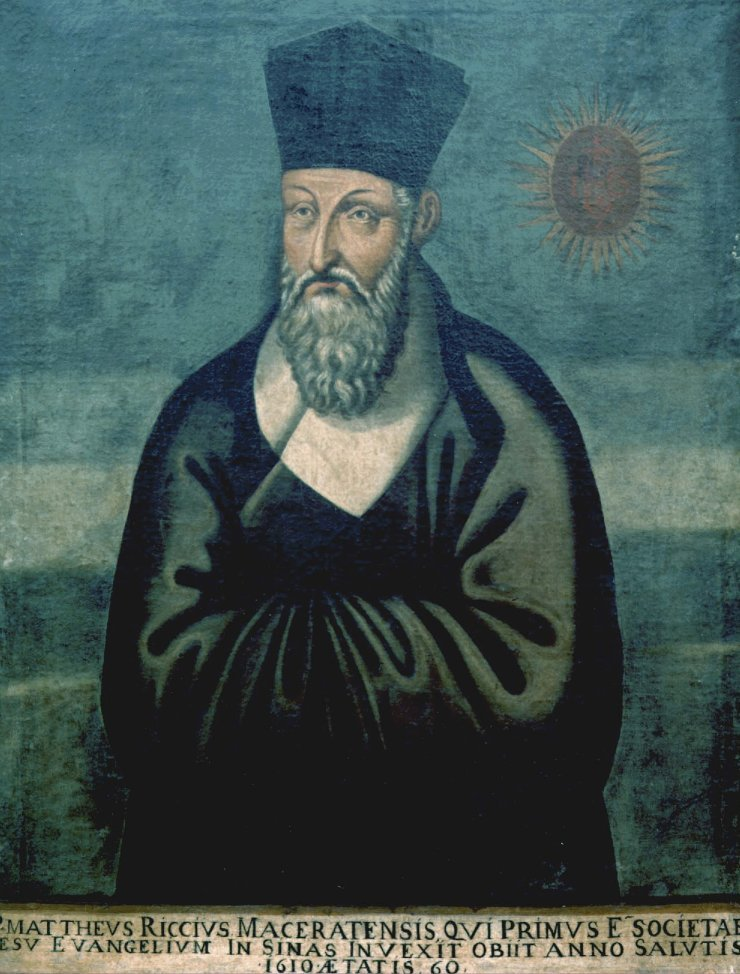
Matteo Ricci in a Ming-style daopao

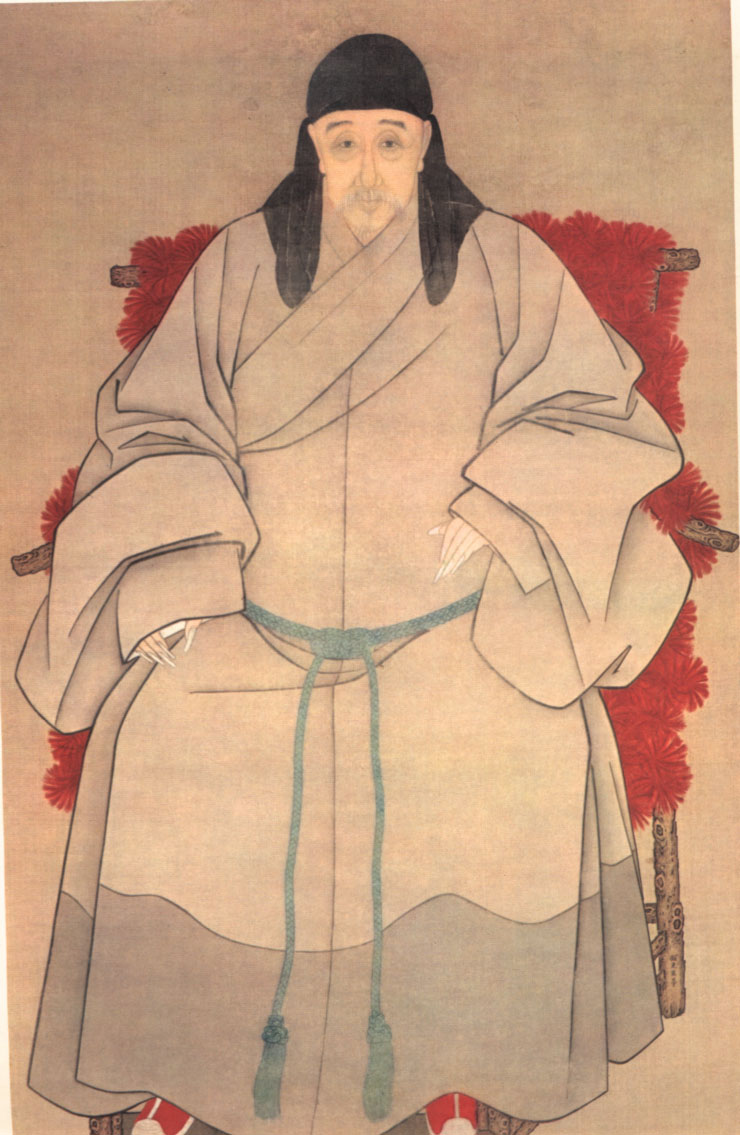
A scholar-bureaucrat in casual dress.

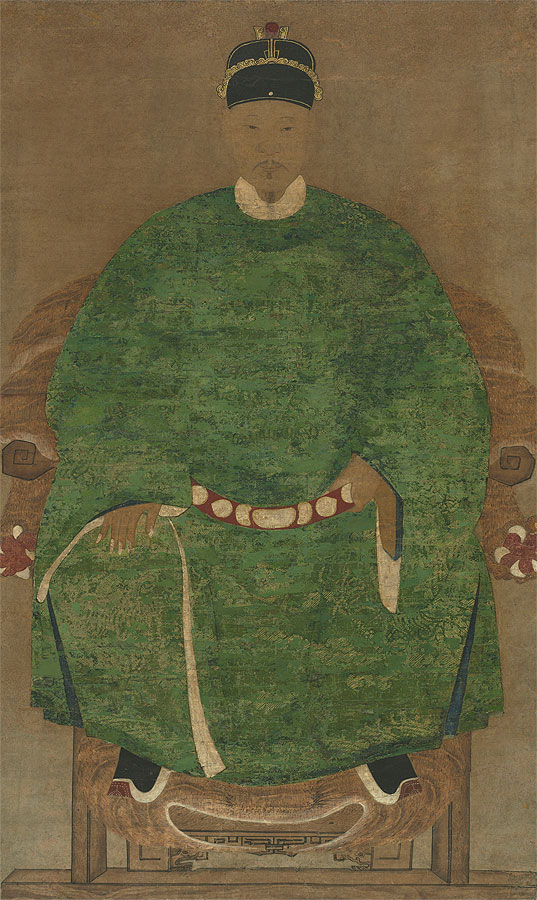
Portrait of Koxinga in formal dress.

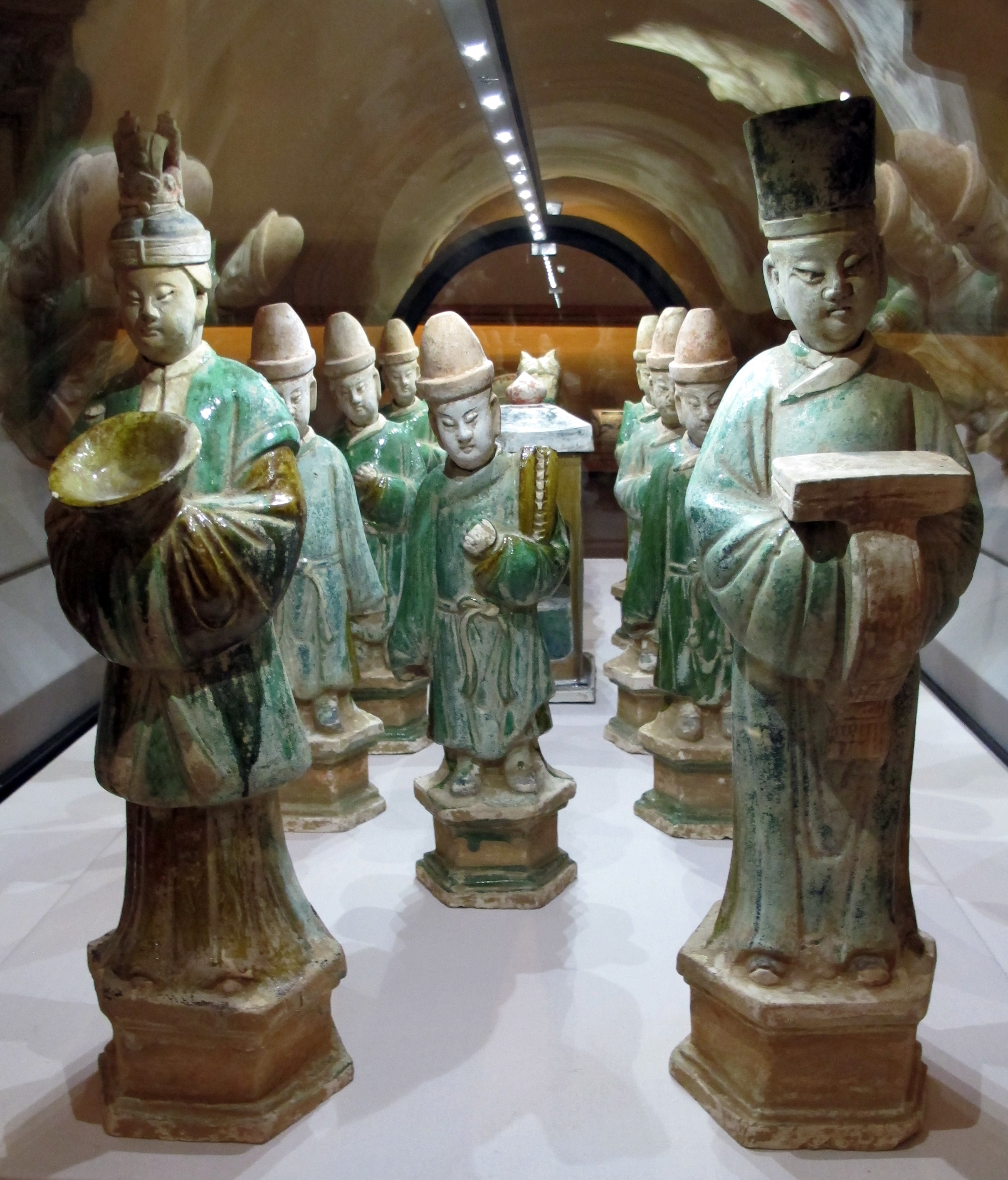
Ming-era clerks of various positions

Though the Ming dynasty restored Hanfu, the dynasty also brought many changes. For example, the formal robes of the early Ming emperors had close-fitting sleeves instead of the Song dynasty's voluminous sleeves. The collar of the Ming dynasty clothing changed from the symmetrical type of the Song dynasty to the circular type. Moreover, under the influence of the Yuan dynasty's court dress, the xiongbei (胸背; central badges) found on the official cloths became square in shape, different from Song dynasty's round shape. Compared with the clothing of the Tang dynasty, the proportion of the upper outer garment to lower skirt in the Ming dynasty was significantly inverted. Since the upper garment was shorter and the lower garment was longer, the jacket gradually became longer to cover the exposed skirt.

The Ming dynasty implemented the use of gold and silver interlocking buckles to close clothing and collars. In the middle of the Ming dynasty, the interlocking buttons were often paired with the upper garment with standing collar; it was commonly used by women partially because they wanted to cover their bodies to show modesty and preserve their chastity and because of the cold climate period. Skirts with pleats became very popular and the skirt colour tended to be light. Another form of skirt which was worn in the Ming dynasty is a skirt with two pieces which was deeply pleated and was sewn to a separate, single waistband. In the late Ming dynasty, Ming dynasty women wore the pifeng daily, the ru (short jacket) with a skirt and a short over skirt (yaoqun), the ao (袄; a long jacket) which is worn with a skirt, and the bijia. The shuitianyi was also worn in the late Ming dynasty. Han Chinese women also wore dudou as an undergarment.

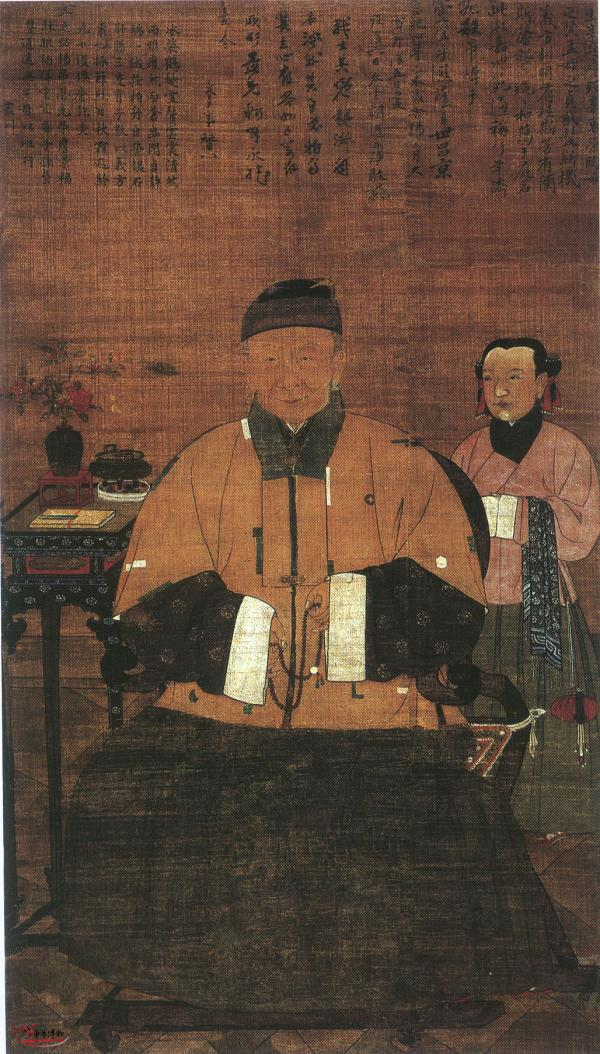
Old lady in banbi accompanied by maid

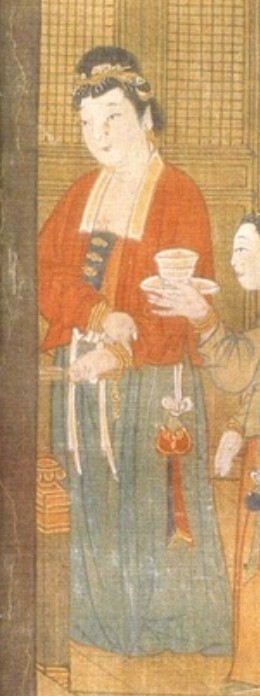
A female ghost in typical Ming-style Hanfu, adapted from a Buddhist allegory

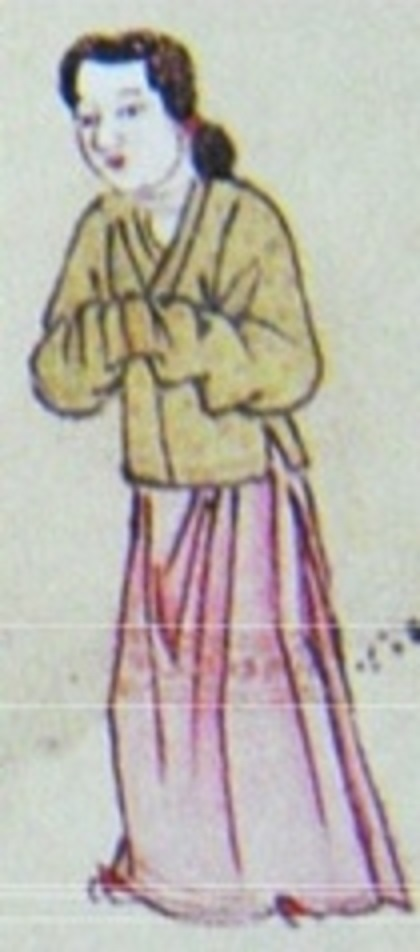
Painting of a Ming dynasty woman.

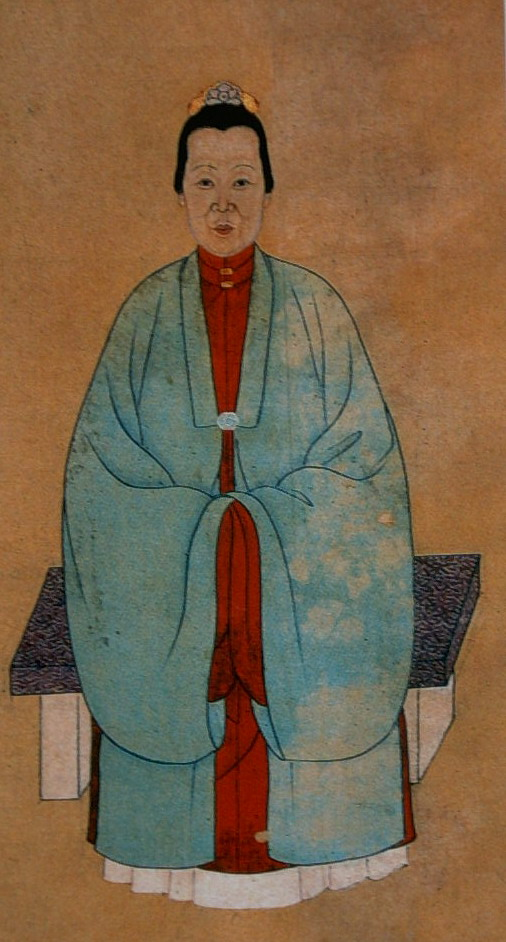
Ming noble woman.

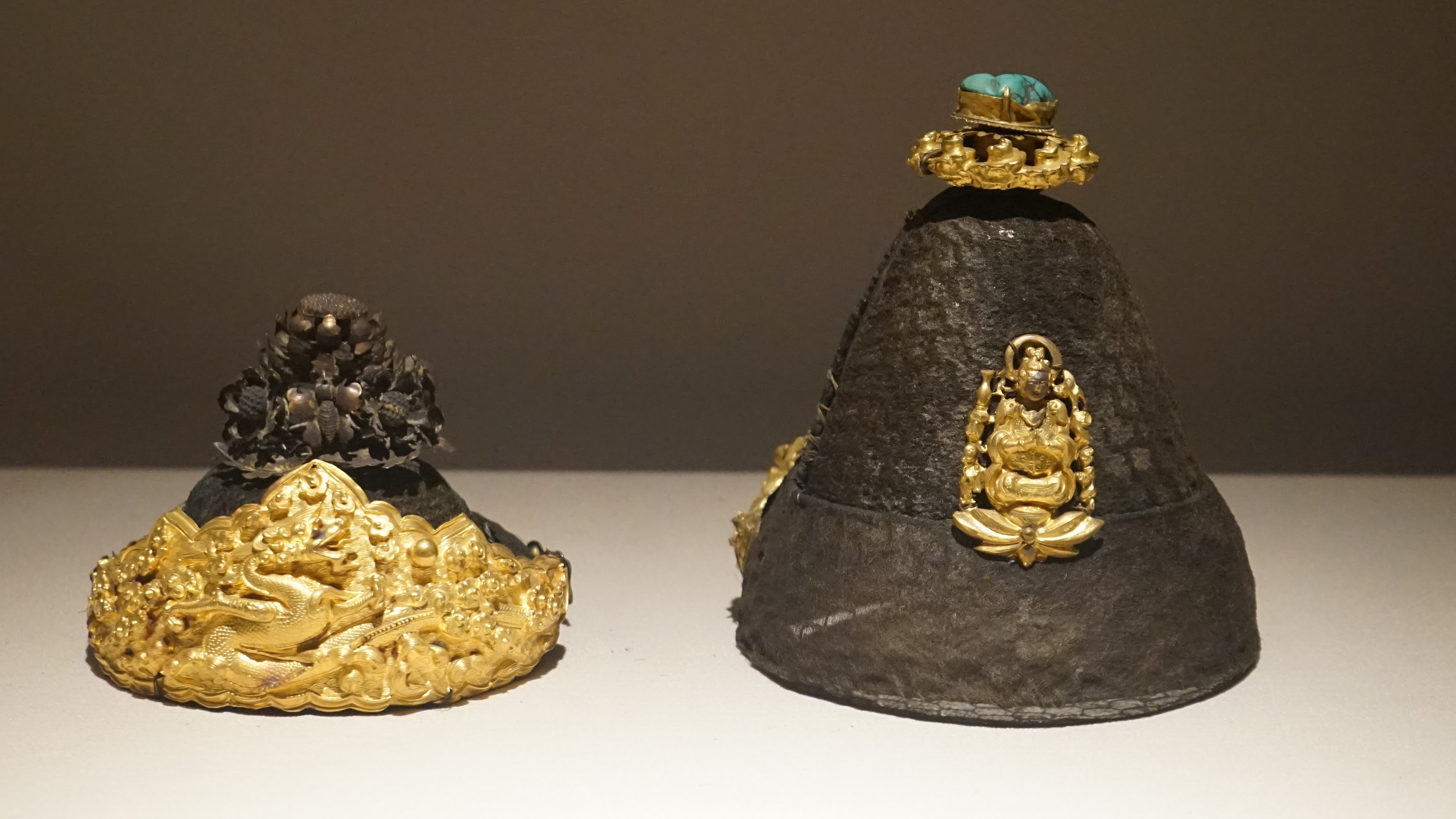
Diji (䯼髻/狄髻), a type of decorative guan worn over topknot, became a common type of headwear among married women of status.

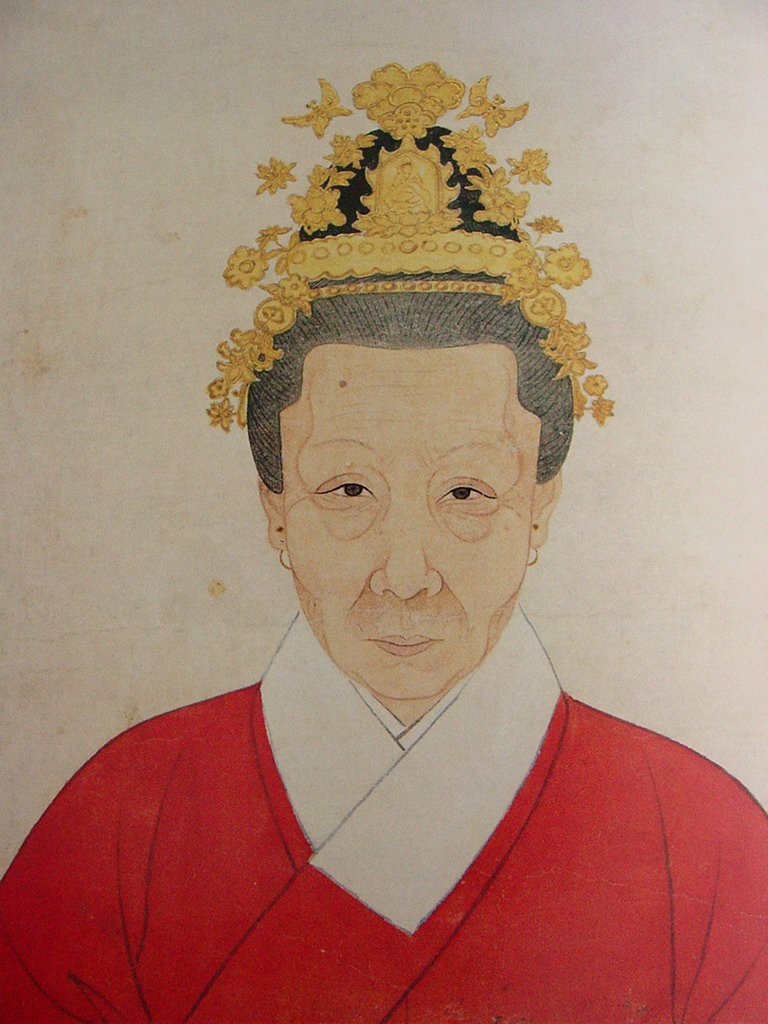

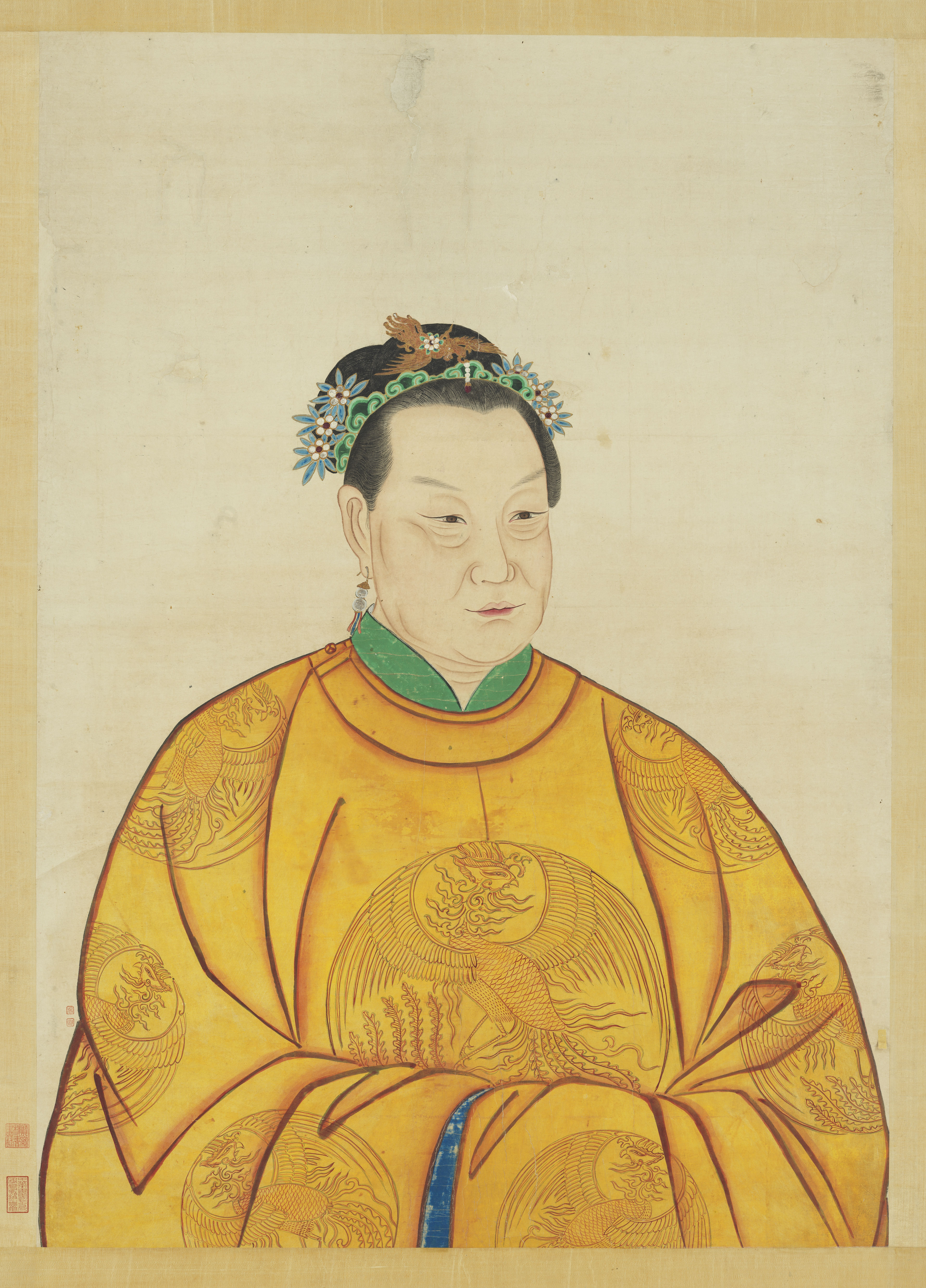

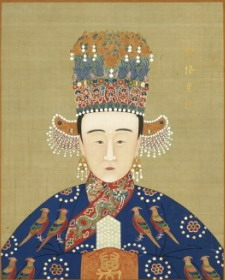

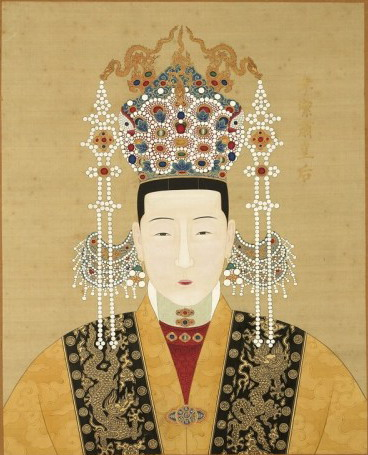

While clothing regulation were strictly enforced in the early Ming dynasty; it started to weaken in the Mid-Ming dynasty (around the early 16th century) which has been attributed to the failing of ritual practice and the expansion of commercialization which has led to a weakened state control over the clothing system, and thus to an eventual dress code transgression. In the late Ming, the dress code was widely transgressed by sons of officials and eunuchs who clothes which did not denote their real social status. Fashion changed quickly relatively to the earlier years during the late Ming which caused distress to the literati. The literati were also concerned about the wives of the elites who would parade and show off their clothing and ornaments without having anyone to reproach them. Despite the attempts of Confucians scholars to urge the ban of illegal and/or improper dress, the dressing code was not enforced by the imperial court.

When Han Chinese ruled the Vietnamese in the Fourth Chinese domination of Vietnam due to the Ming dynasty's conquest during the Ming–Hồ War they imposed the Han Chinese style of men wearing long hair on short haired Vietnamese men. Vietnamese were ordered to stop cutting and instead grow their hair long and switch to Hanfu in only a month by a Ming official. Ming administrators said their mission was to civilized the unorthodox Vietnamese barbarians. The Ming dynasty only wanted the Vietnamese to wear long hair and to stop teeth blackening so they could have white teeth and long hair like Chinese. A royal edict was issued by Vietnam in 1474 forbidding Vietnamese from adopting foreign languages, hairstyles and clothes like that of the Lao, Champa or the "Northerners" which referred to the Ming. The edict was recorded in the 1479 Complete Chronicle of Dai Viet of Ngô Sĩ Liên in the Later Lê dynasty. The Vietnamese had adopted the Chinese political system and culture during the 1,000 years of Chinese rule so they viewed their surrounding neighbours like Khmer Cambodians as barbarians and themselves as a small version of China (the Middle Kingdom). By the Nguyen dynasty the Vietnamese themselves were ordering Cambodian Khmer to adopt Han Chinese culture by ceasing "barbarous" habits like cropping hair and ordering them to grow it long besides making them replace skirts with trousers.

Hanbok was influenced by the Hanfu of the Ming dynasty. The Joseon dynasty monarchy looked to Ming China for cultural inspiration. The upper classes and the court of Joseon wore Ming-style clothing but also made a few modifications to make the clothing look distinctively Korean; this led to the formation of the women's hanbok style. The lower class of Joseon imitated the clothing of the upper class.

=== Qing dynasty ===
==== Development of Qing imperial court clothing ====
In the Liao, Jin, Yuan, and Ming dynasties, Jurchen people mainly wore Zuojun gowns. The robes and clothes of the Manchus before entering the customs are called "yijie" in Manchu. They are clothes worn by men, women and children throughout the year. Each gown is cut from a whole piece of clothing. The basic structure is a round neck, a large flap, a left gusset, four-sided slits, a waistband and horseshoe sleeves.

It was mistakenly thought that the hunting ancestors of the Manchus skin clothes became Qing dynasty clothing, due to the contrast between Ming dynasty clothes' unshaped cloth's straight length contrasting to the odd-shaped pieces of Qing dynasty longpao and chaofu. Scholars from the west initially wrongly thought these clothing were purely Manchu as the early Manchu rulers wrote several edicts stressing on maintaining their traditions and clothing. However, there is evidence from excavated tombs which indicates that China had a long tradition of garments that led to the development of the Qing chaofu, and it was not invented or introduced by Manchus in the Qing dynasty or Mongols in the Yuan dynasty. In some cases, the Qing dynasty went further than the Ming dynasty in imitating ancient China to display legitimacy with resurrecting ancient Chinese rituals to claim the Mandate of Heaven after studying Chinese classics. Qing sacrificial ritual vessels deliberately resemble ancient Chinese ones even more than Ming vessels. Tungusic people on the Amur river like Udeghe, Ulchi and Nanai adopted Chinese influences in their religion and clothing with Chinese dragons on ceremonial robes, scroll and spiral bird and monster mask designs, Chinese New Year, using silk and cotton, iron cooking pots, and heated house from China during the Ming dynasty.

Moreover, the Manchus originally did not have their own dragon robes or weave textiles and they had to obtain Ming dragon robes, Chaofu and cloth when they paid tribute to the Ming or traded with the Ming. Therefore, Manchu clothes were modified the Hanfu of Ming China to form their court costume, making it easier to use while hunting. The development of Manchu clothing in the late Ming Dynasty mainly imitated Mongolian clothing, such as the characteristic buttoned jackets, and the arrow sleeves are obviously characteristics of Mongolian clothing. The Ming dragon robes were simply modified, cut, and tailored by Manchus at the sleeves and waist to make them narrow around the arms and waist instead of wide and added a new narrow cuff to the sleeves; they also made slits in the skirt to make it suitable for falconry, horse riding and archery. The new cuff was made out of fur. The robe's jacket waist had a new strip of scrap cloth put on the waist while the waist was made snug by pleating the top of the skirt on the robe. The Manchus added sable fur skirts, cuffs and collars to Ming dragon robes and trimming sable fur all over them before wearing them. However, some denied that the popular Manchu jackets in the Qing Dynasty originated from the Hanfu in the Ming Dynasty. Han Chinese court costume (chaofu) was modified by the Manchu by adding a ceremonial big collar (daling) or shawl collar (pijianling); the clothing was also reduced in bulk, the sleeves made narrower, and the side-fastening changed from cross-collared to a curved overlapping right front. The clothing was fastened with loops and buttons. The Manchu also decorated their early Qing robes with dragons similarly to the Ming chaofu.

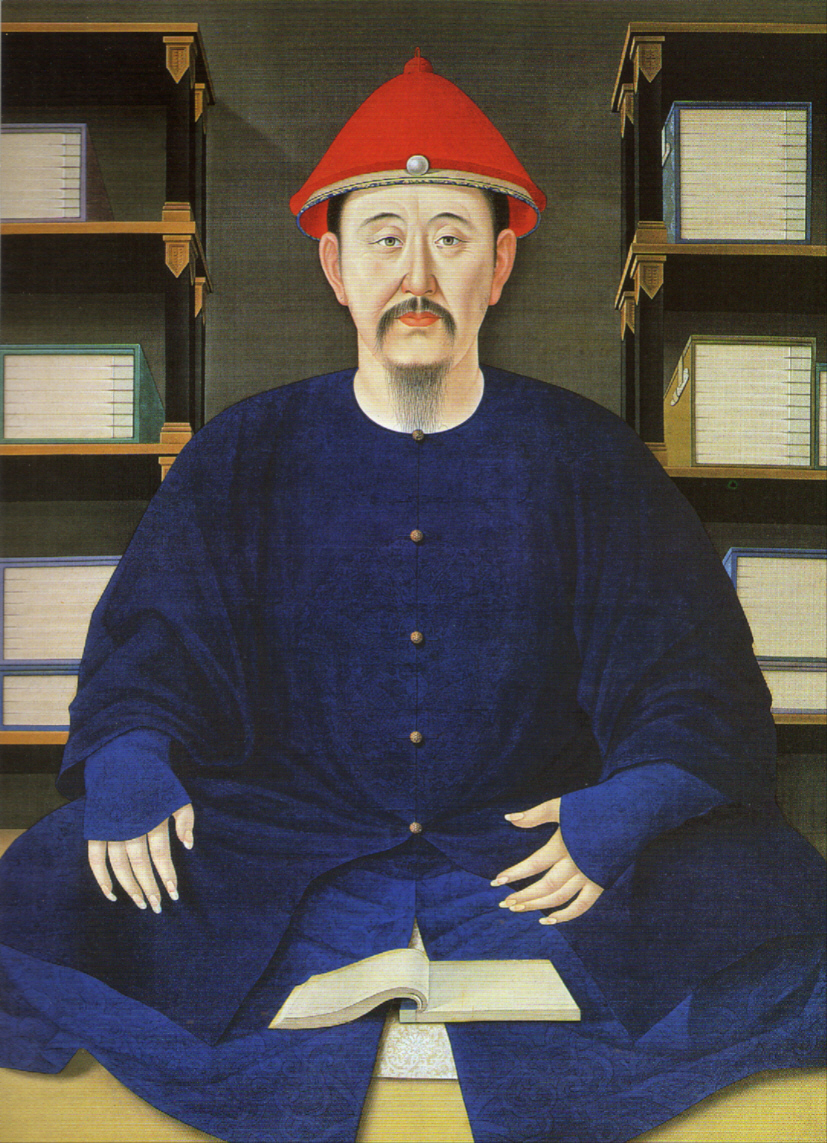
Kangxi Emperor in casual dress.

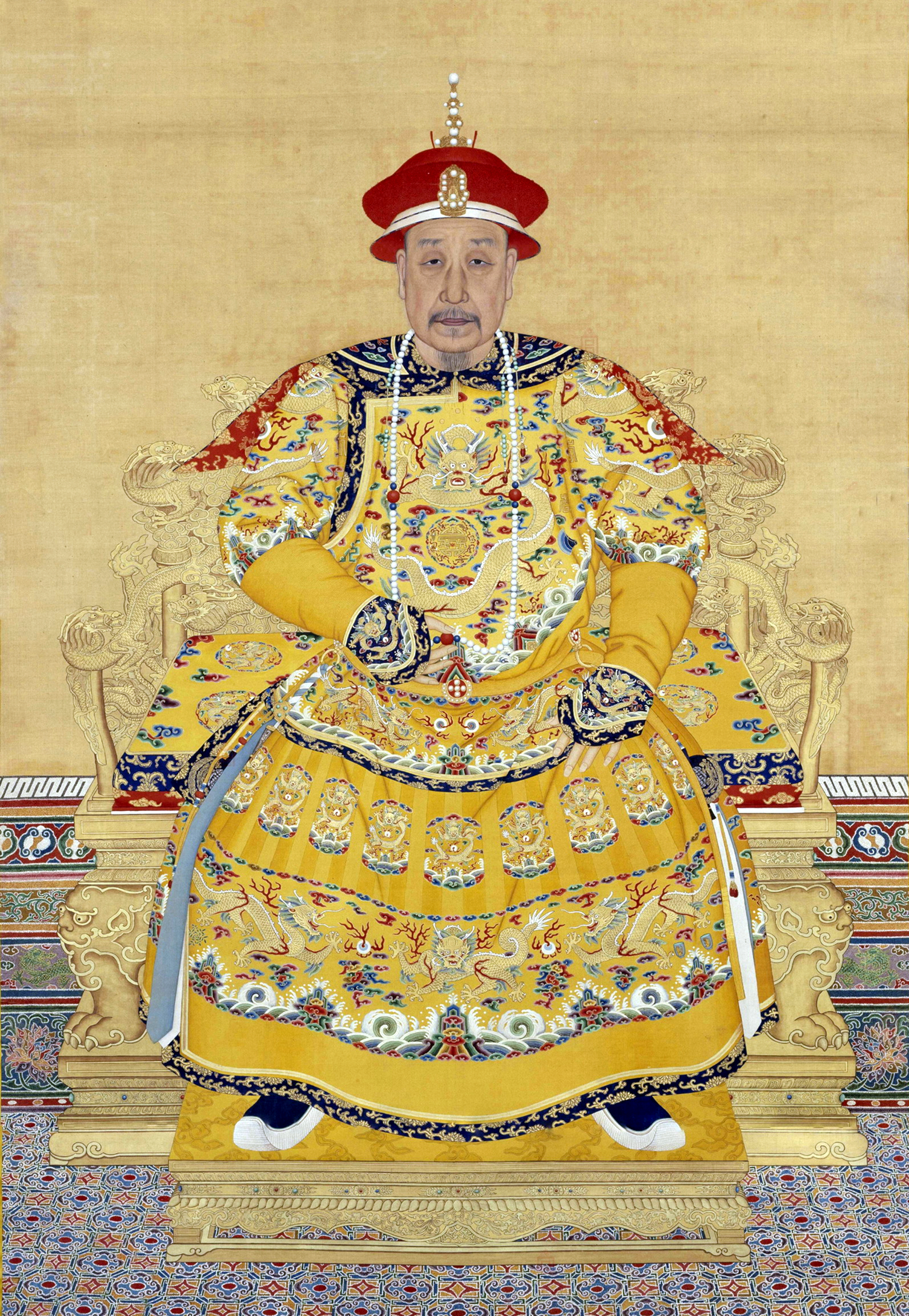
Qianlong Emperor in chaofu (court dress), Qing dynasty

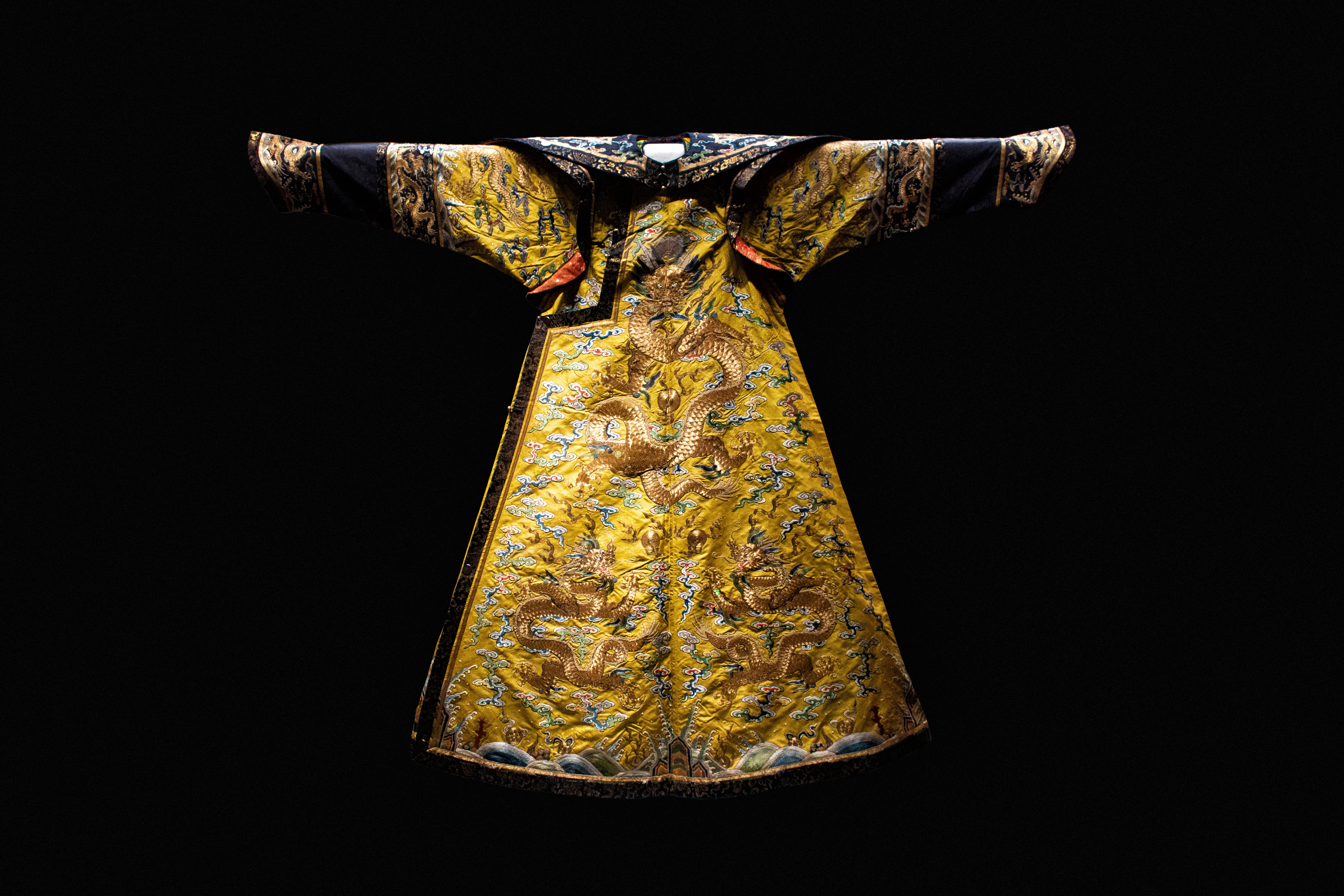
Qing dynasty Empress Robe, reign of Yongzheng Emperor.

The Spencer Museum of Art has six longpao robes that belonged to Han Chinese nobility of the Qing dynasty which shows the diversity of the late 18th and 19th century non-imperial dragon robes. Ranked officials and Han Chinese nobles had two slits in the skirts while Manchu nobles and the Imperial family had 4 slits in skirts. All first, second and third rank officials as well as Han Chinese and Manchu nobles were entitled to wear 9 dragons by the Qing Illustrated Precedents. Qing sumptuary laws only allowed four clawed dragons for officials, Han Chinese nobles and Manchu nobles while the Qing Imperial family, emperor and princes up to the second degree and their female family members were entitled to wear five clawed dragons. However officials violated these laws all the time and wore 5 clawed dragons and the Spencer Museum's 6 long pao worn by Han Chinese nobles have 5 clawed dragons on them.

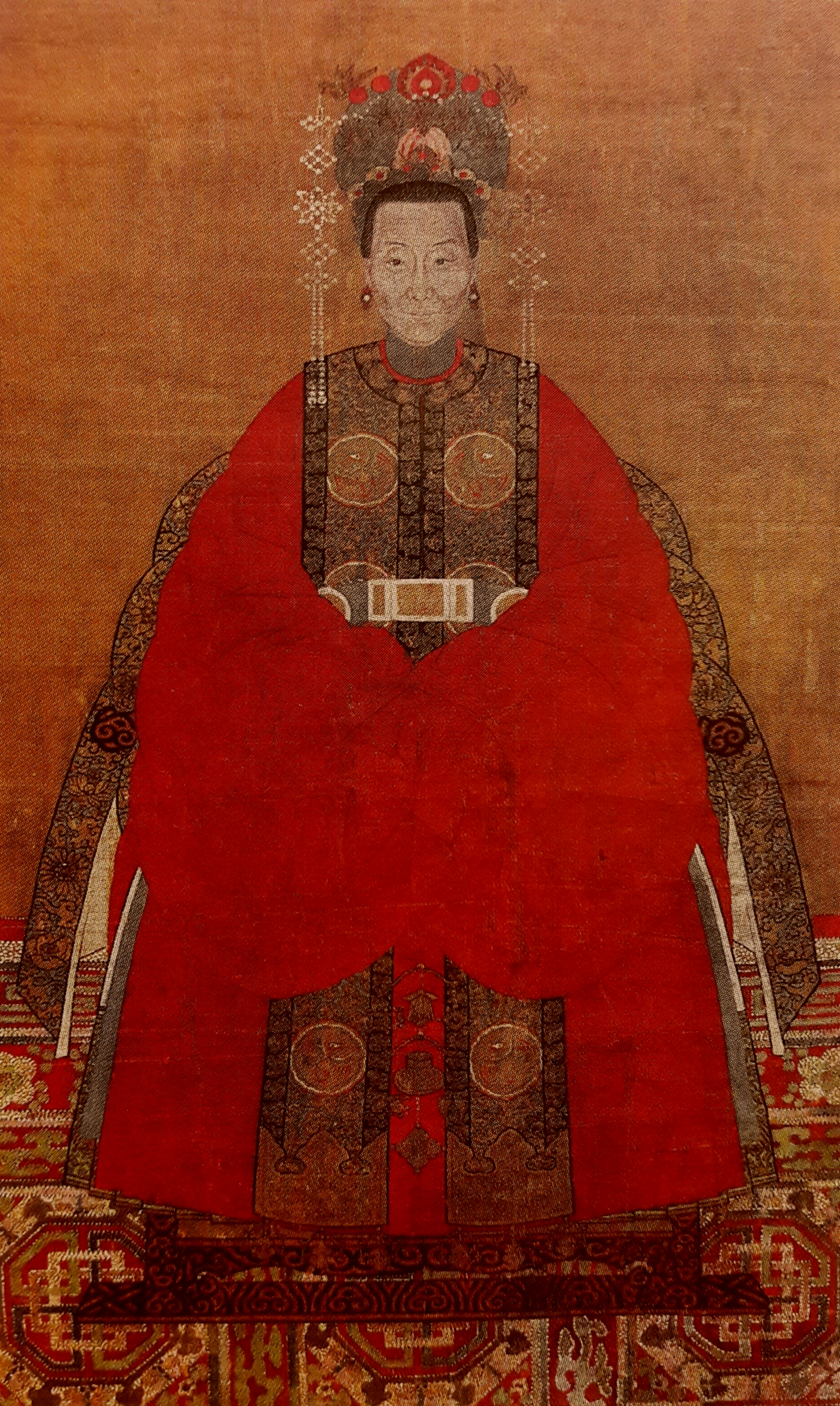
Lady in a red robe, with a xiapei on top of her robe, and a coronet, Qing dynasty.

Wives of Han Chinese noblemen and high-ranking officials had to wear semi-official formal dresses on ceremonial events; their clothing consisted of a mang ao (a four-clawed dragon loose fitting jacket with wide sleeves), a xiapei, a mang chu (a dragon skirt which was embroidered with dragons and phoenixes on the front and back skirt panels), a jiao dai (a rigid hooped belt which was worn around the jacket) and a phoenix coronet. The women mang ao was red in colour if the wearer was a man's principle wife; it was originally undecorated but started to be decorated with dragon by the 18th century. The xiapei was developed from the xiapei worn in Ming dynasty; the xiapei in Qing was first worn when the wedding day of a woman; after the wedding, she would wear it for special important events which were connected with her husband's status.

===== Clothing reform by Qianlong =====
The Qing dynasty court continued to reform and regulate the clothing of its subjects, but discussion on ethnic clothing was a sensitive topic even after the Qing dynasty had consolidated its rule. By 1759 AD, the Qianlong Emperor commissioned the Illustrated Precedents for the Ritual Paraphernalia of the Imperial Court (Huangchao Liqi Tushi) which was published and enforced by 1766; this publication covered several aspects including the dressing and accessories of the emperors, princes, noblemen and their consorts, Manchu officials, their wives and daughters, and the dress codes for Han Chinese men officials who had reached the rank of mandarin and were employed and their wives; as well as Han Chinese men who were waiting for an official appointment. The aim of this edict was made to preserve the Manchu identity once again, but at the same time, it also attempted to align the image of the emperor with Confucian ideas and codes of behaviours and manners. The dress code designed in the Huangchao Liqi Tushi continued to be used as the standard for the court attire until the end of the Qing dynasty. The Manchu continued to use the five colours symbolism in their clothing which was in line with the previous Han Chinese dynasties; however, they chose the colour blue as their dynasty colour and generally avoided the use of red colour in their clothing because red was the dynasty colour of Ming dynasty. On the other hand, Han Chinese continued to view red as a lucky colour because of its connection with rulers of Ming dynasty, and used it extensively in celebratory events and at weddings.

==== Ban of Chinese clothing and hairstyle ====
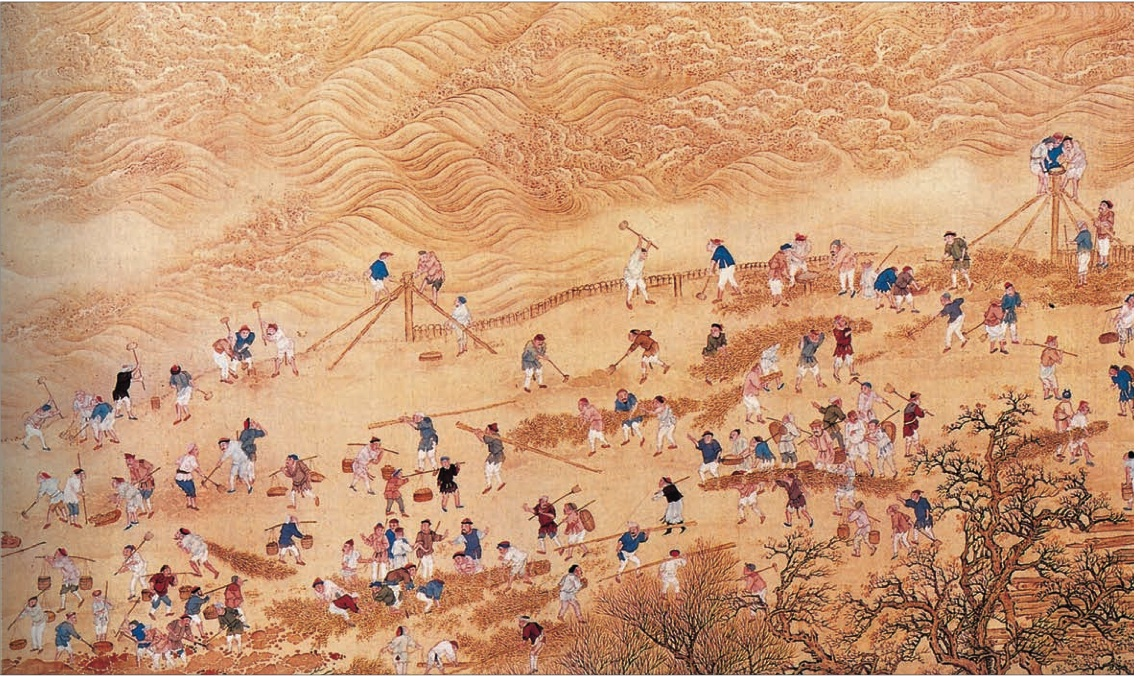
Coexistence of Hanfu and Manchu clothing, Qing dynasty

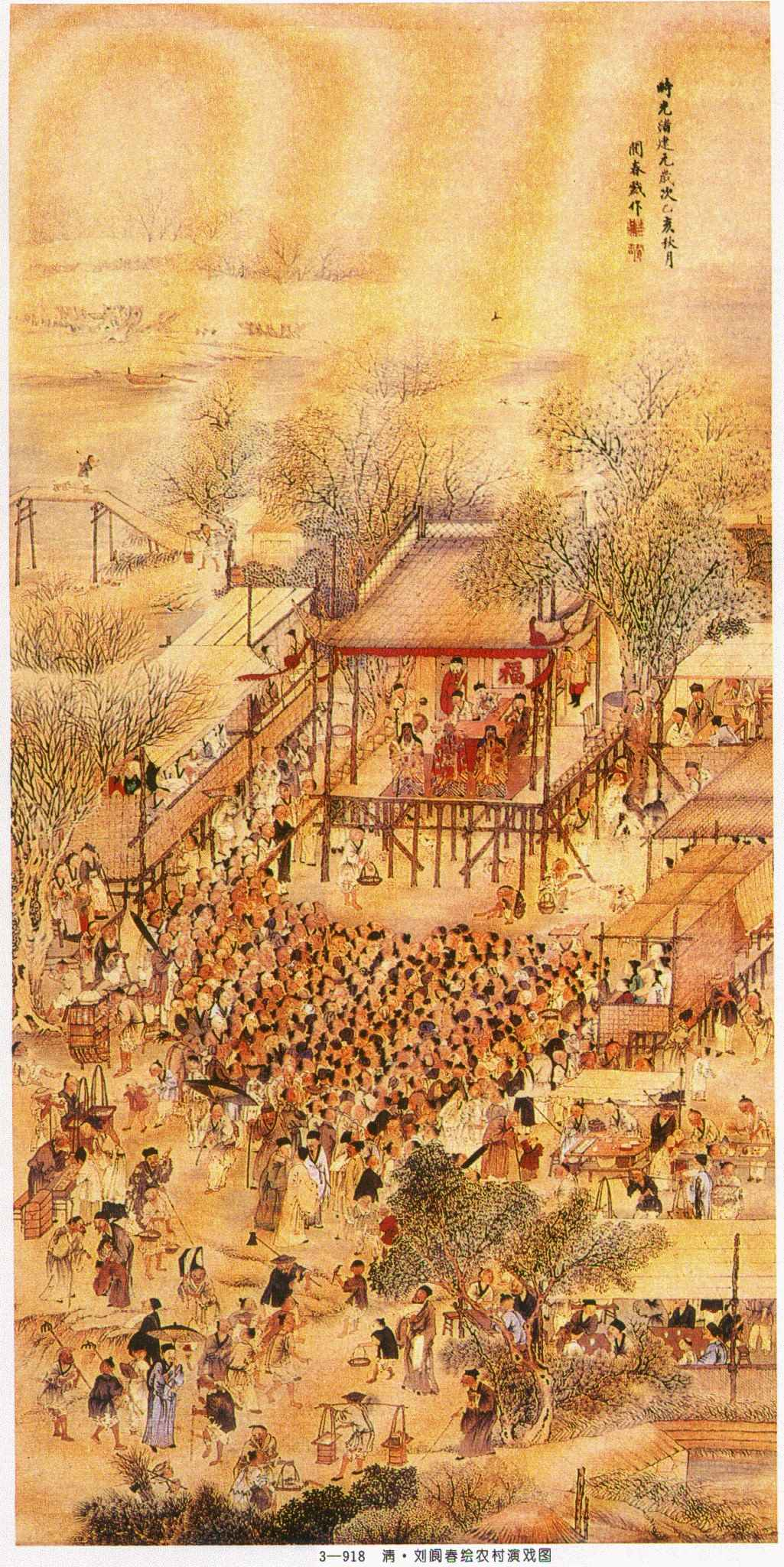
Hanfu, early Qing dynasty

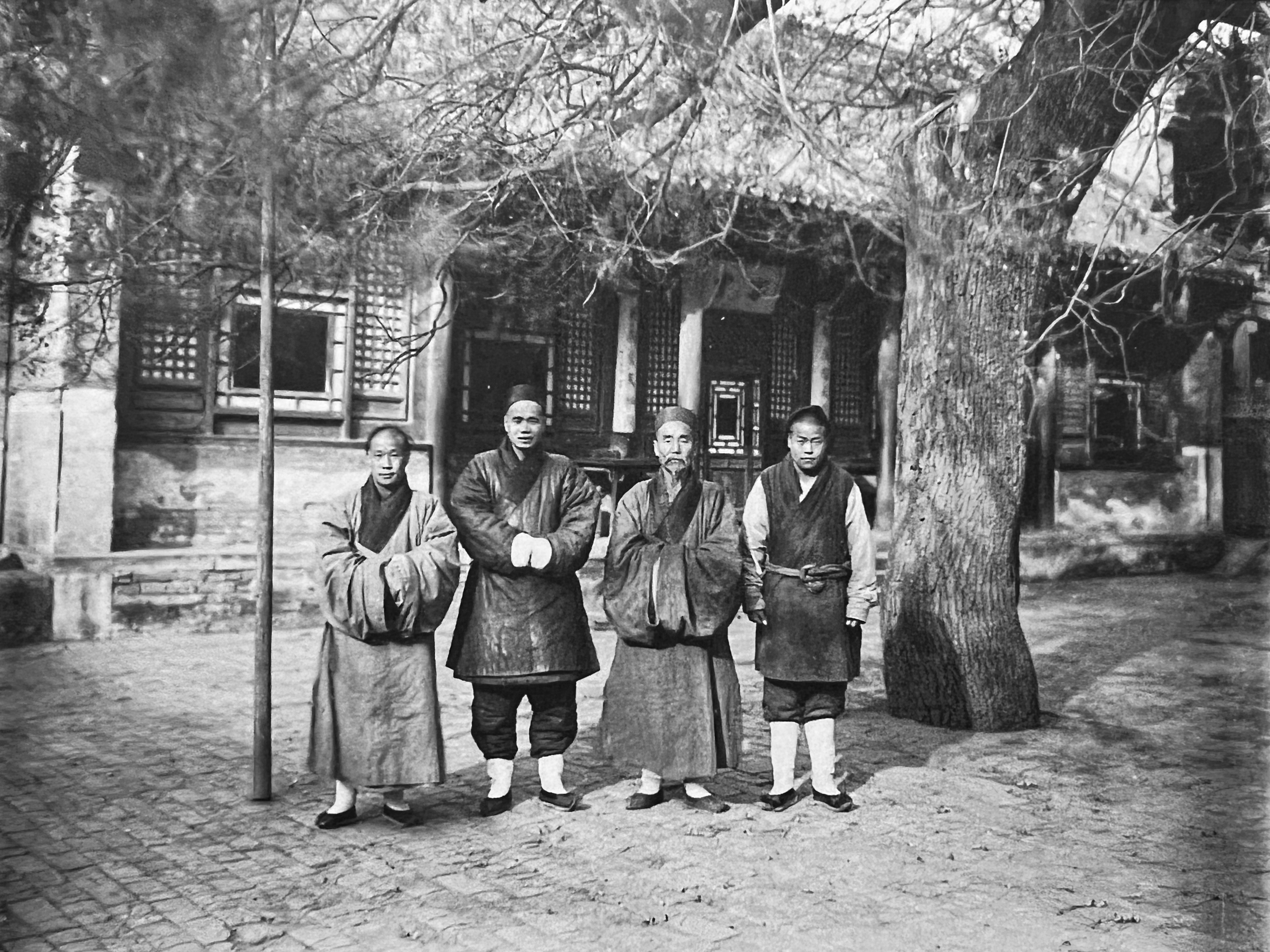
Hanfu continues to be worn by the Taoist clergy. Photo taken from between 1890 and 1910.

When the Manchus established the Qing dynasty, the authorities issued decrees having Han Chinese men to adopt Manchu hairstyle by shaving their hair on the front of the head and braiding the hair on the back of the head into pigtails. The resistances against the hair shaving policy were suppressed. Han Chinese did not object to wearing the queue braid on the back of the head as they traditionally wore all their hair long, but fiercely objected to shaving the forehead so the Qing government exclusively focused on forcing people to shave the forehead rather than wear the braid. Han rebels in the first half of the Qing who objected to Qing hairstyle wore the braid but defied orders to shave the front of the head. One person was executed for refusing to shave the front but he had willingly braided the back of his hair.

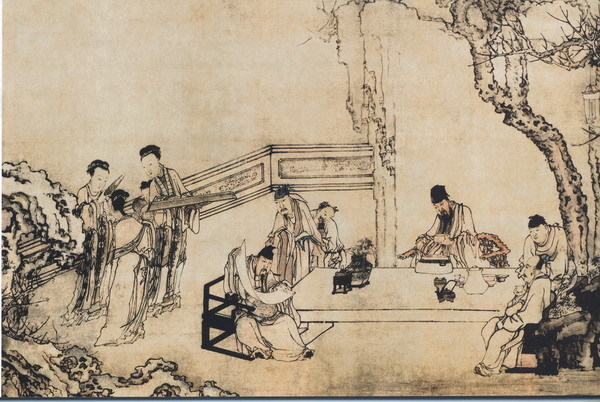
Hanfu worn by men and women, from A Night Banquet at Peach and Plum Garden in Spring painting, Qing dynasty, before 1772

The Qing imposed the shaved head hairstyle on men of all ethnicities under its rule even before 1644 like upon the Nanai people in the 1630s who had to shave their foreheads. In 1645, tifayifu edict was issued; however it was strongly opposed by the Han Chinese, in particular those who belonged to the late Ming dynasty scholars class and literati. Qing Manchu prince Dorgon initially canceled the order for all men in Ming territories south of the Great wall (post 1644 additions to the Qing) to shave. It was a Han official from Shandong, Sun Zhixie and Li Ruolin who voluntarily shaved their foreheads and demanded Qing Prince Dorgon impose the queue hairstyle on the entire population which led to the queue order. Even after a decade following tifayifu policy implementation, Han Chinese still resisted against the order of shaving the hair and changing into Manchu clothing frequently. Even during emperor Kangxi's reign, a large number of ordinary people continued to wear Ming dynasty hairstyles and clothing; however, the Han Chinese officials and military generals had to wear the queue and Manchu clothing. The men of certain ethnicities who came under Qing rule later like Salar people and Uyghur people already shaved all their heads bald so the shaving order was redundant. However, the shaving policy was not enforced in the Tusi autonomous chiefdoms in Southwestern China where many minorities lived. There was one Han Chinese Tusi, the Chiefdom of Kokang populated by Han Kokang people.

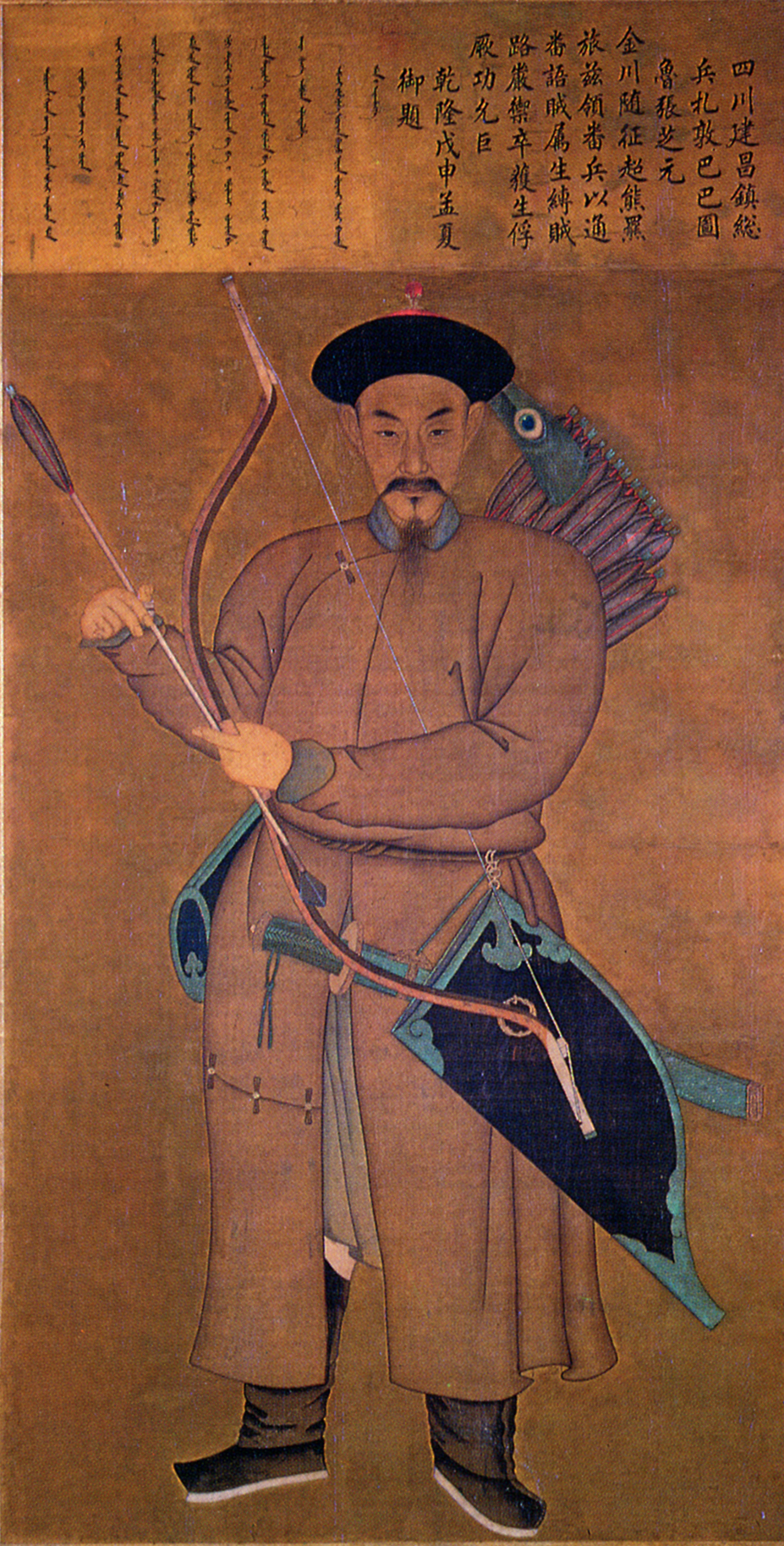
Han Chinese general Zhang Zhiyuan wearing Manchu-style military outfit.

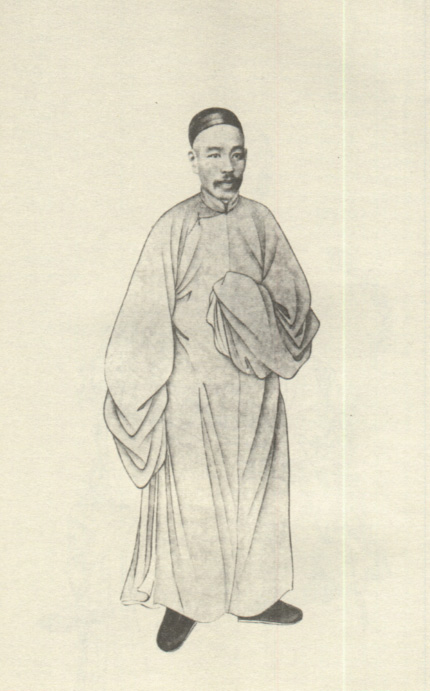
Portrait of Huang Zunxian wearing changshan, the Han Chinese derivative of qizhuang which combined features of the daopao.

During the Qianlong reign, Liu Zhenyu was executed for urging the return of presumably Ming dynasty clothing. However, during this period, Manchu style clothing was only required for scholar-official elite, such as the Eight Banners members and Han men serving as government officials, but not the entire male population; therefore, Han Chinese men were allowed to continue to dress in Ming dynasty clothing. But over time, some Han Chinese civilian men voluntarily adopted Manchu clothing, such as the changshan and magua. In the early middle of the Qing Dynasty, the rhetoric and resistance against the Manchu clothing system subsided slightly. By the end of the Qing Dynasty, some officials, literati, and civilians began to wear Manchu clothing, but there were still many officials, literati, and civilians who still wore Hanfu.

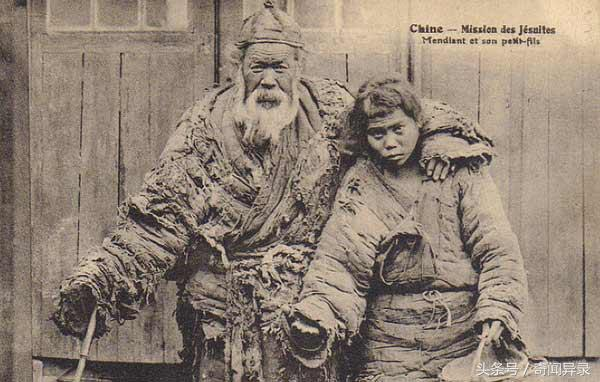
A pair of beggars, grandfather and grandson, from the late Qing Dynasty, were wearing hanfu. Although the clothes were tattered, the characteristics of hanfu were obvious.

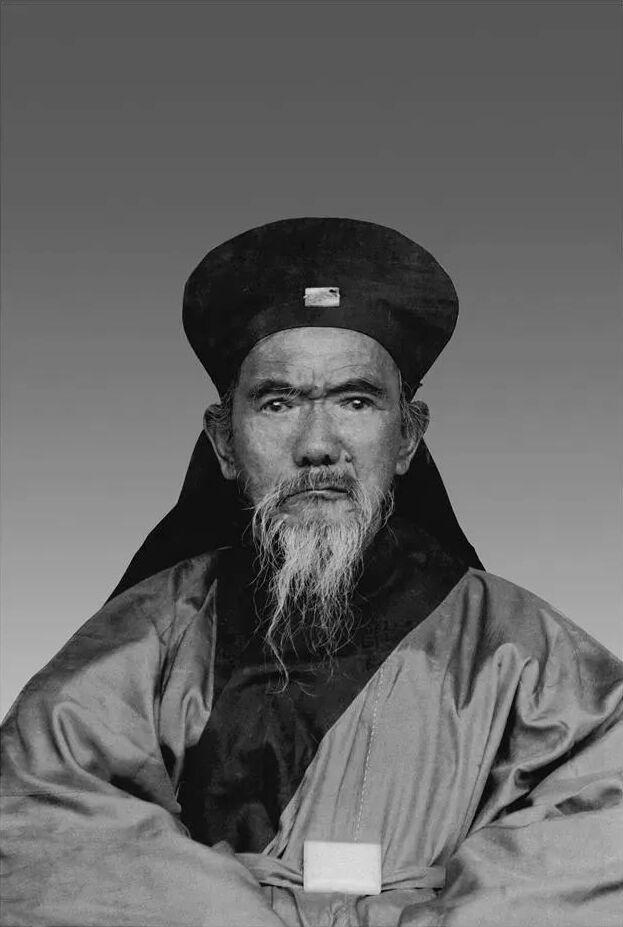
Portrait of Confucian scholar and educator Niu Zhaolian, wore hanfu in his daily life.

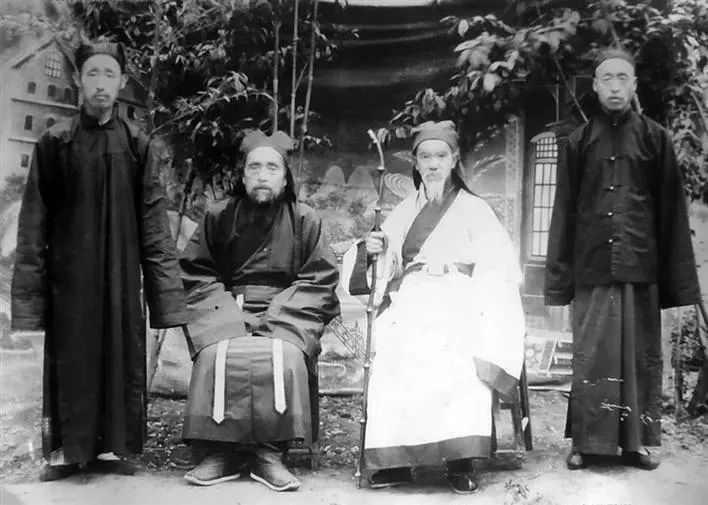
Niu Zhaolian sitting beside his friend also wearing hanfu.

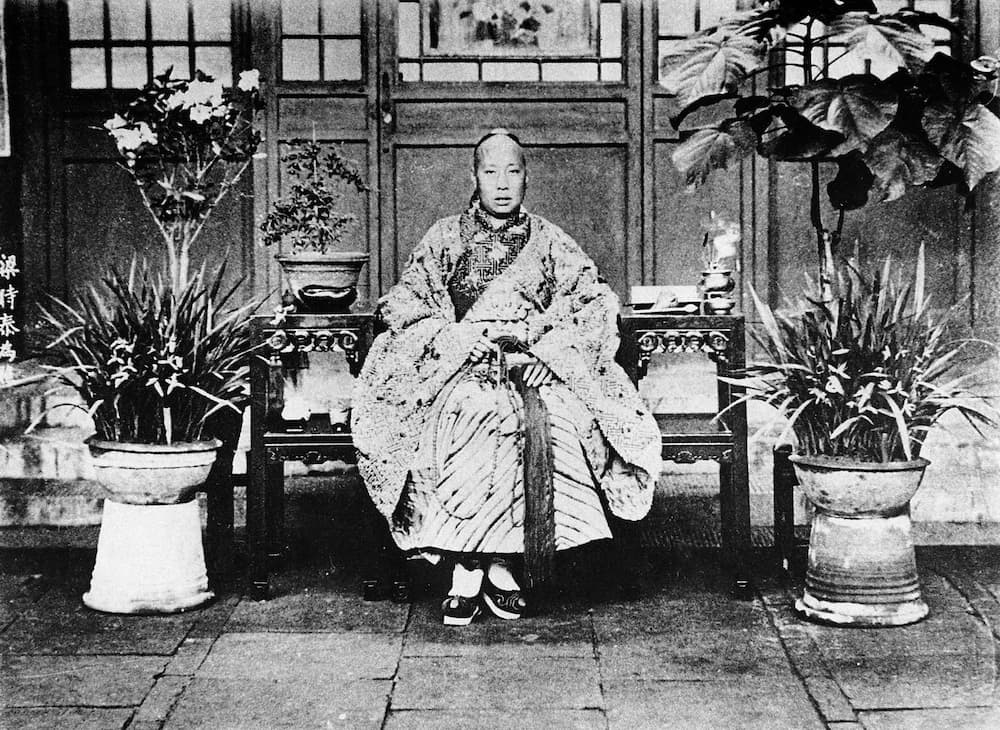
A senior Eunuch in the late Qing Dynasty, he was wearing hanfu.

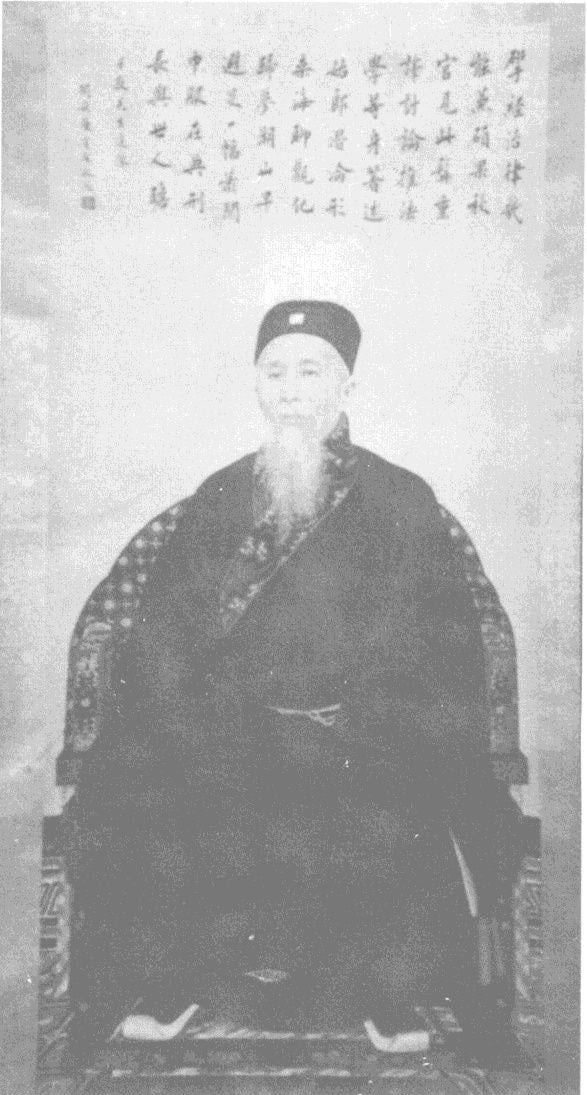
Shen Jiaben, the Minister of Justice, who is known as one of the Ten Ministers of the Late Qing Dynasty, wears hanfu in his daily life.

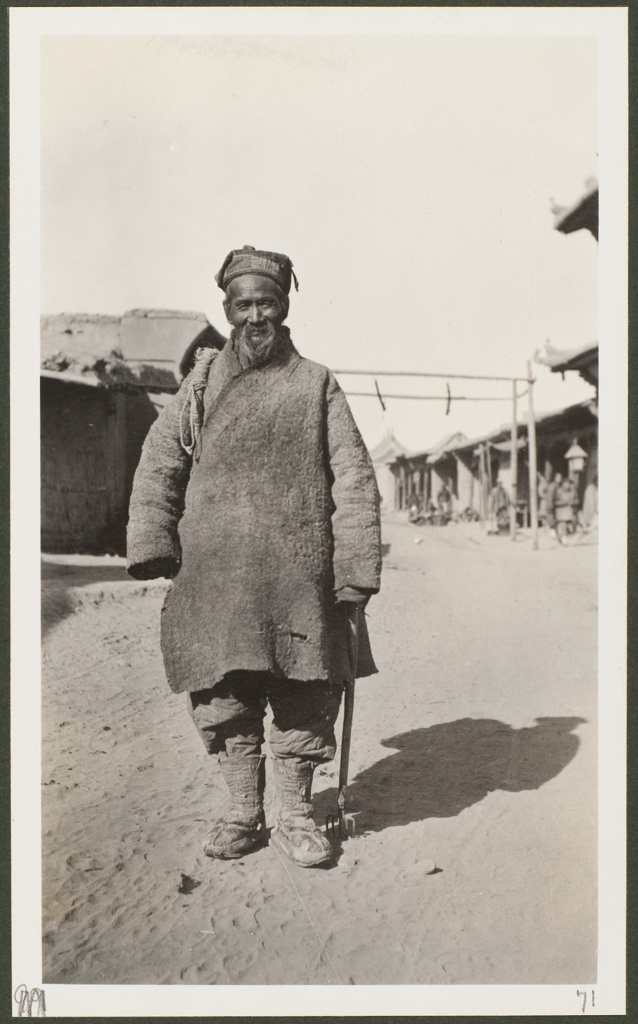
Chinese Muslim man in 1910 wearing hanfu.

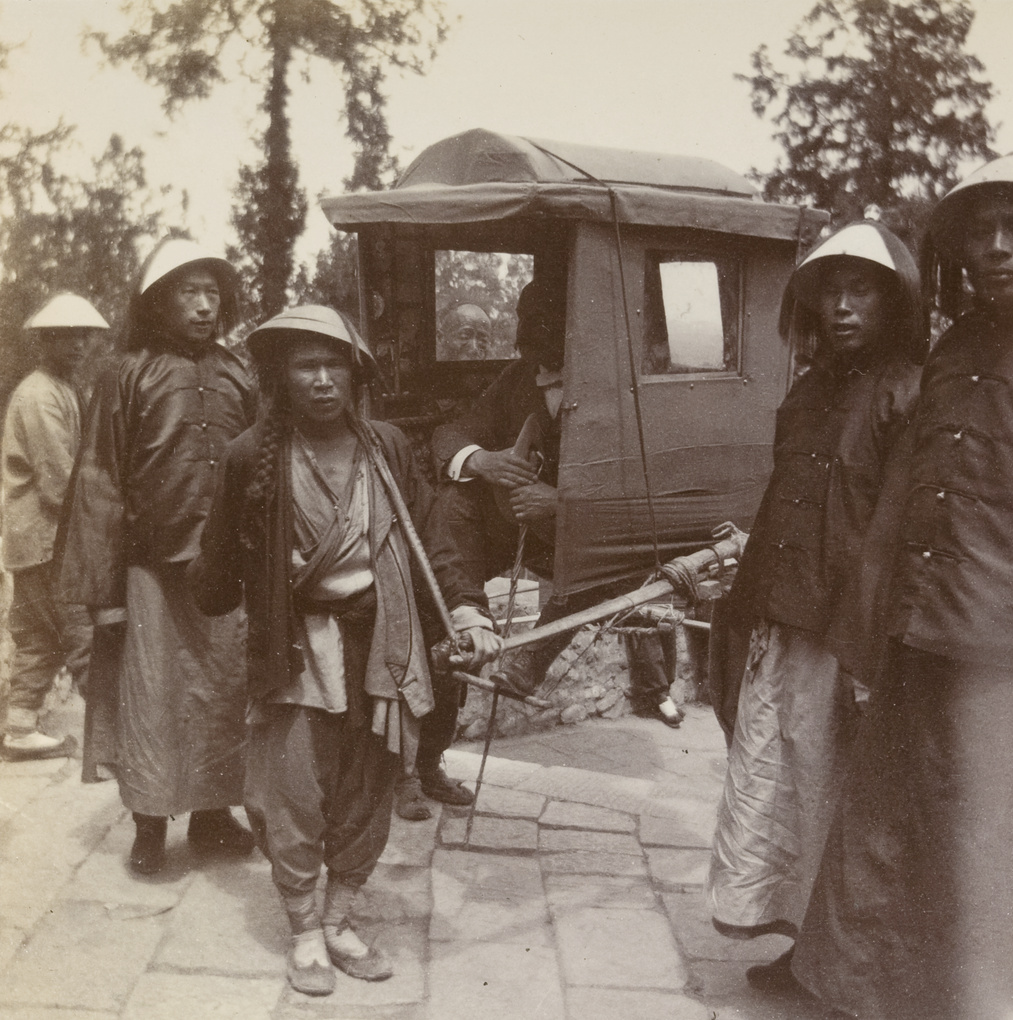
Manchu-style jackets were sometimes folded to resemble jiaoling youren cross-collars of hanfu.

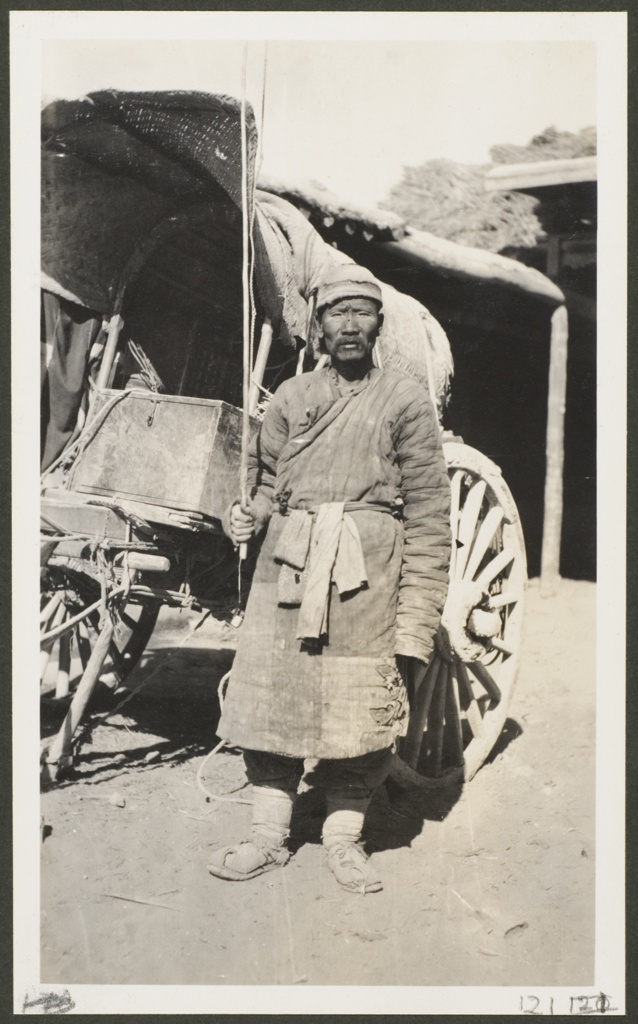
1910 carter similarly wearing his coat folded into a cross-collar.

In the Edo period, the Tokugawa Shogunate of Japan passed orders for Japanese men to shave the pate on the front of their head (the chonmage hairstyle) and shave their beards, facial hair and side whiskers. This was similar to the Qing dynasty queue order imposed by Dorgon making men shave the pates on the front of their heads.

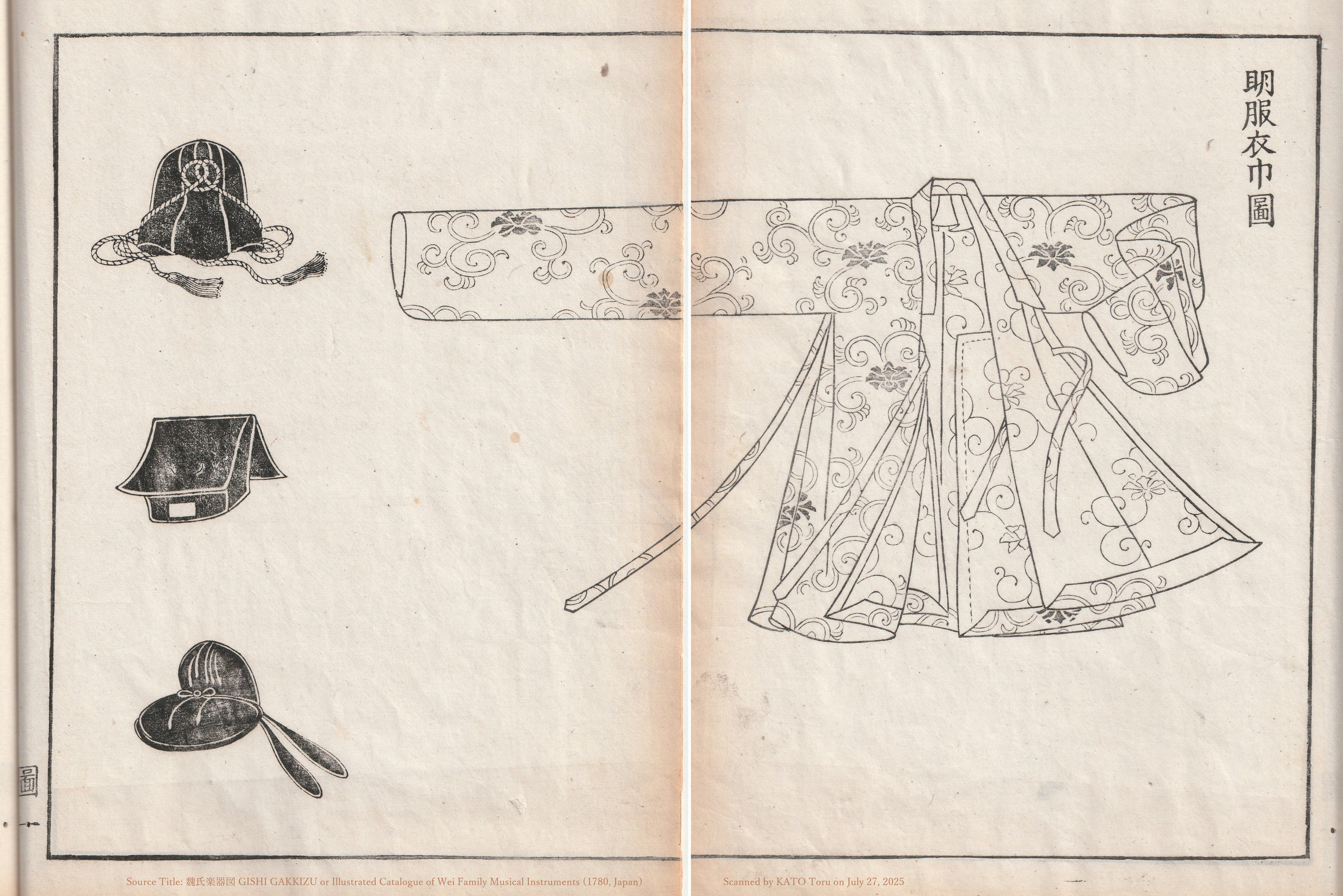
Ming-style Costume and Headgear. From Gishi Gakkizu (魏氏楽器図) — Illustrated Catalogue of Wei Family Musical Instruments (1780, Japan)

During the Edo period, Japan partially preserved the Hanfu clothing of the Ming dynasty. In China, after the Qing conquest, wearing the official robes of the Ming dynasty and performing its court music were prohibited. However, thanks to Wei Zhiyan (ca. 1617–1689), who fled to Japan, the court music of the Ming dynasty—known in Japan as Mingaku (明楽)—was transmitted and thus escaped extinction. In Japan, performers of Mingaku traditionally wore Ming-style clothing as formal attire during performances.

During the late Qing dynasty, the Vietnamese envoy to Qing were still wearing the official attire in Ming dynasty style. Some of the locals recognized their clothing, yet the envoy received both amusement and ridicule from those who did not.

==== Tifayifu exemptions ====
The implementation of tifayifu policy, the early Qing dynasty court also prohibited Han Chinese from wearing some specific Manchu items and prohibited banner-women from dressing as Han Chinese women to maintain ethnic distinction. The early Qing dynasty policies also mainly applied to Han Chinese men. Those who were exempted from such policies were women, children, Buddhist and Taoist monks, and Qing dynasty rebels; moreover, men in their living had to wear Manchu-clothing, but they could be buried in Hanfu after their death. However, this was not fully implemented. Women, men, children, and the elderly still wore Hanfu at home and in daily life, festivals, and ceremonies until the end of the Qing Dynasty.

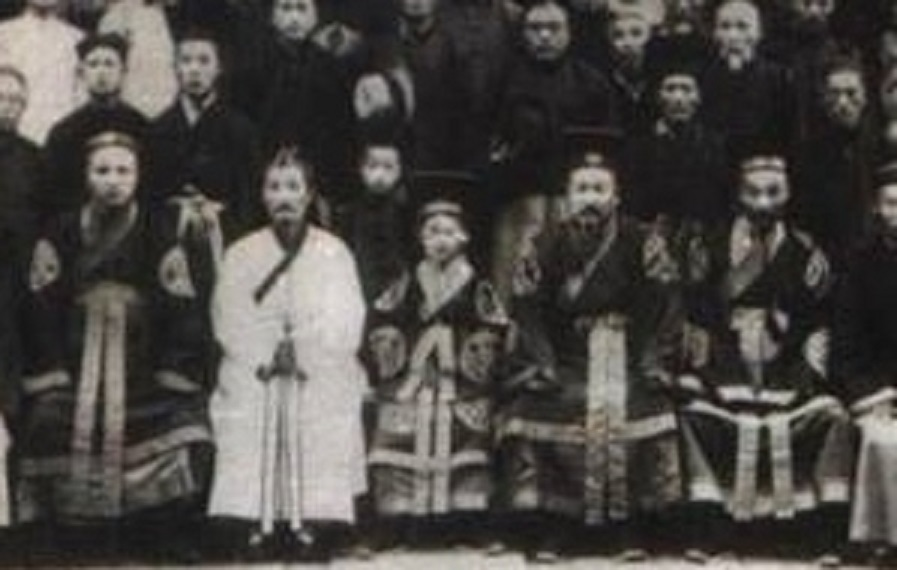
Part of the participants of the 17th Confucius Conference wear hanfu, 1910s.

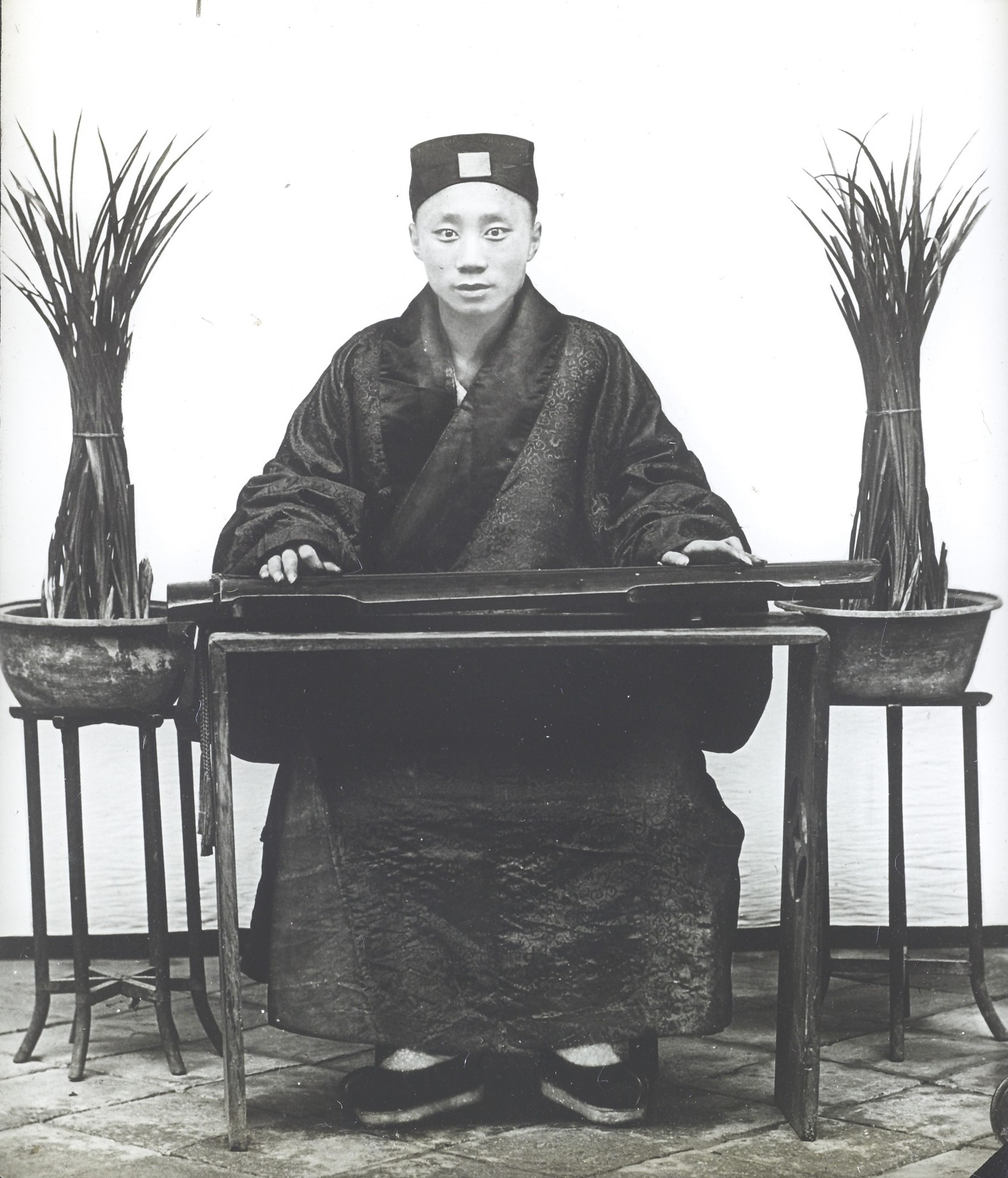
Upper Class Man Sitting at a Table Playing the Qin, 1906–1912.

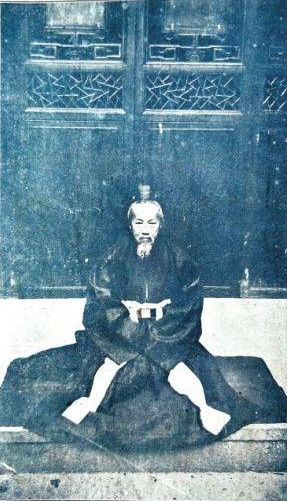
A man wearing hanfu in the late Qing Dynasty

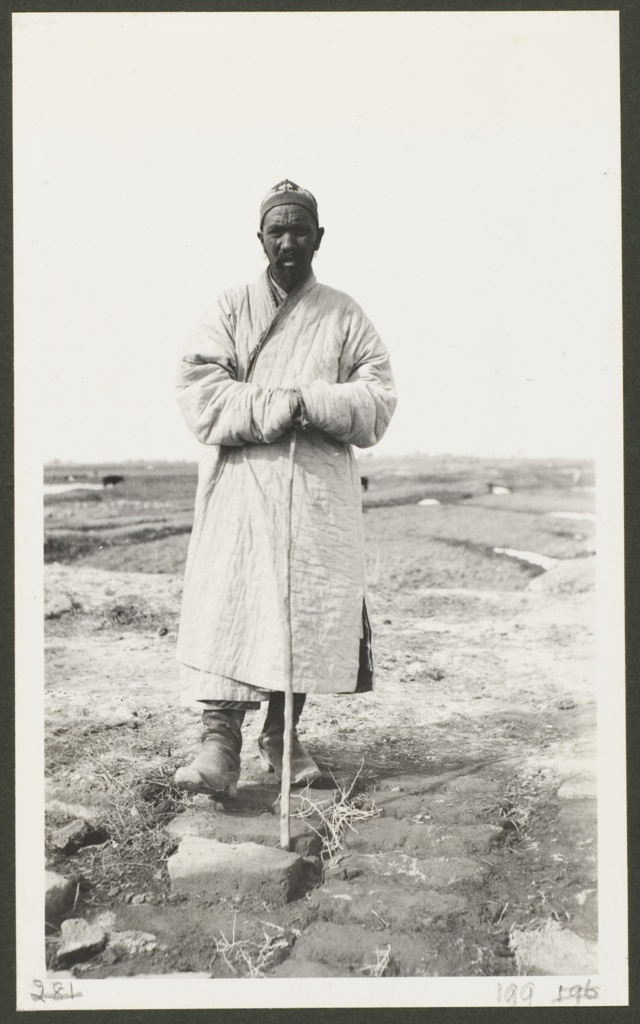
1910 Man from Hami wearing cross-collared clothing.

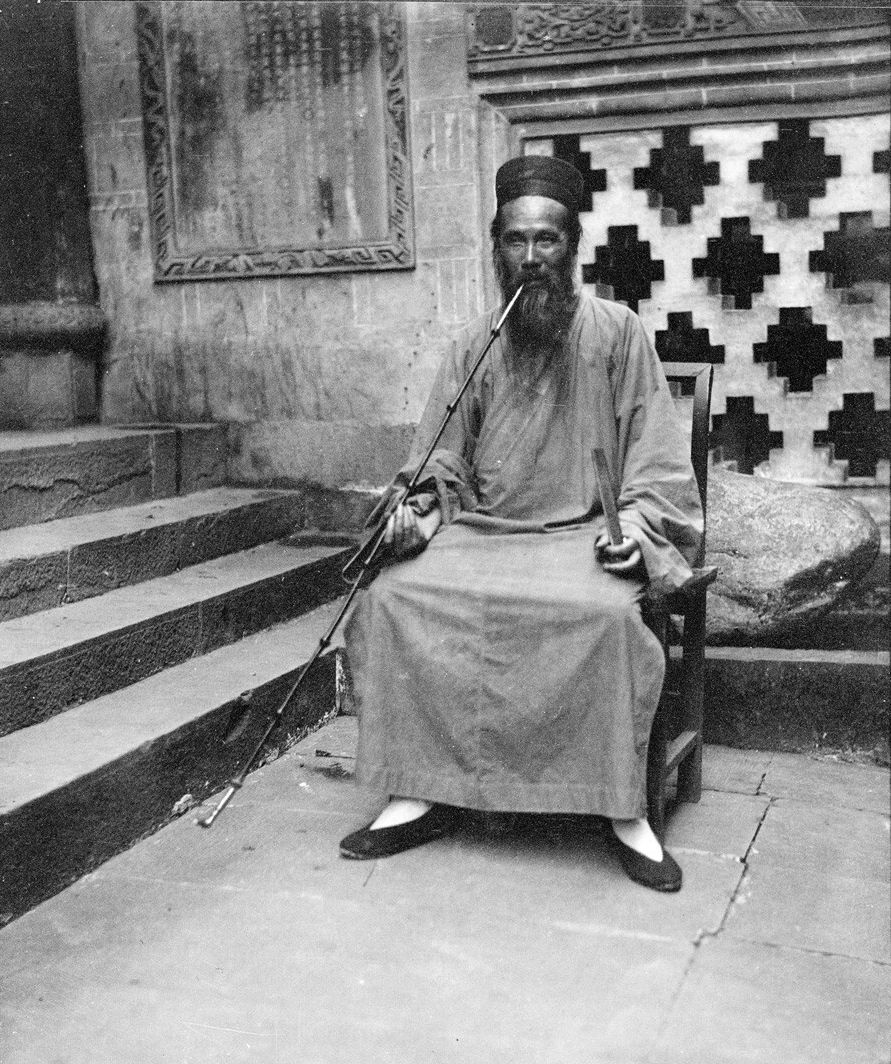
Abbot wearing hanfu. Chengdu, Sichuan, 1917.

===== Rebellion and resistance to Qing =====
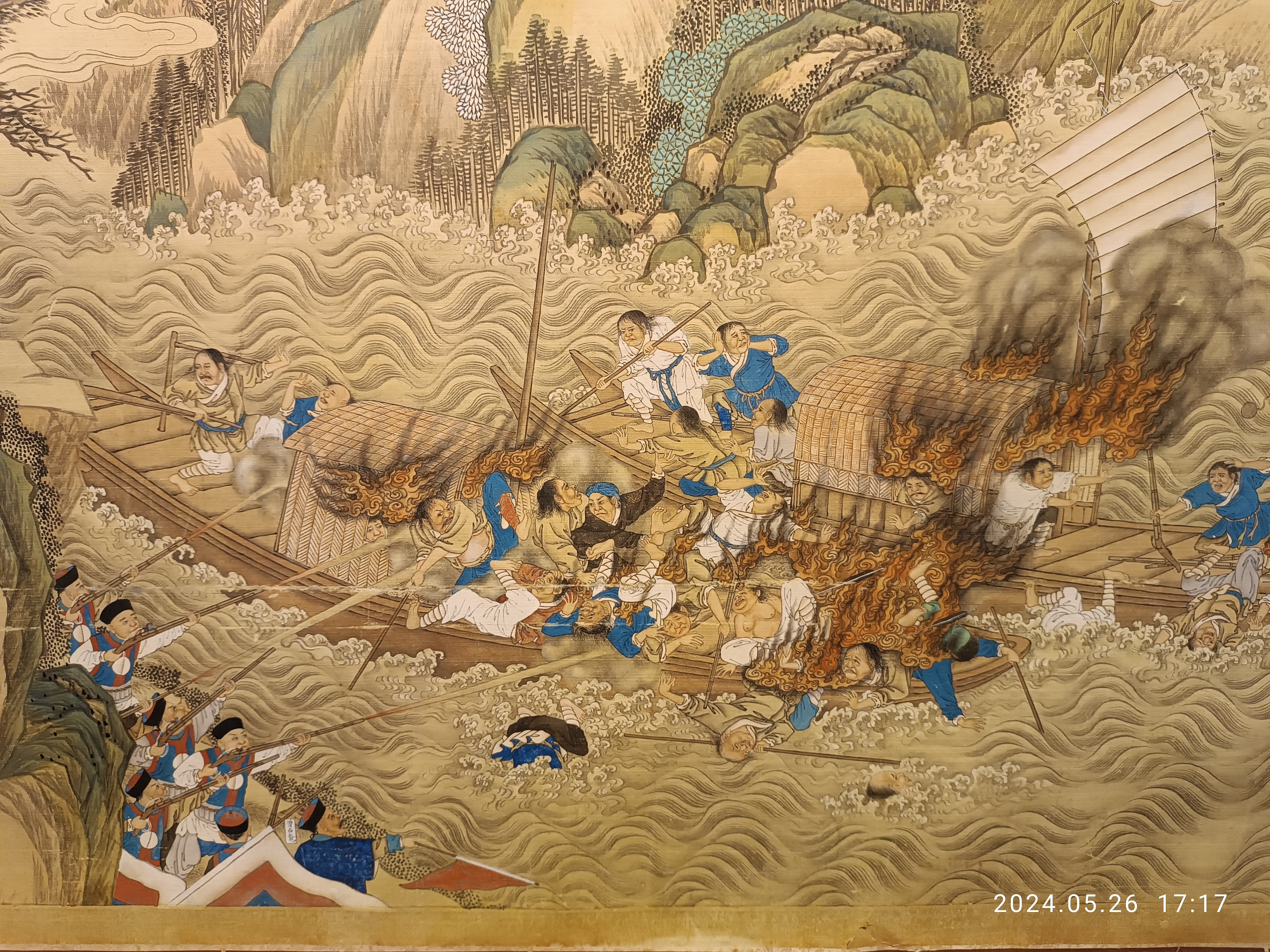
Taiping rebels being depicted as wearing hanfu and keeping long hair.

Han Chinese rebels who went against the Qing dynasty even retained their queue braids on the back but the symbol of their rebellion against the Qing was the growing of hair on the front of the head, causing the Qing government to view shaving the front of the head as the primary sign of loyalty to the Qing rather than wearing the braid on the back which did not violate Han customs and which traditional Han did not object to. Koxinga insulted and criticized the Qing hairstyle by referring to the shaven pate looking like a fly. Koxinga and his men objected to shaving when the Qing demanded they shave in exchange for recognizing Koxinga as a feudatory.The Qing demanded that Zheng Jing and his men on Taiwan shave to receive recognition as a fiefdom. His men and Ming prince Zhu Shugui fiercely objected to shaving.His men and the last Ming dynasty prince, Zhu Shugui (1617 – 1683 AD), fiercely objected to the shaving decree.

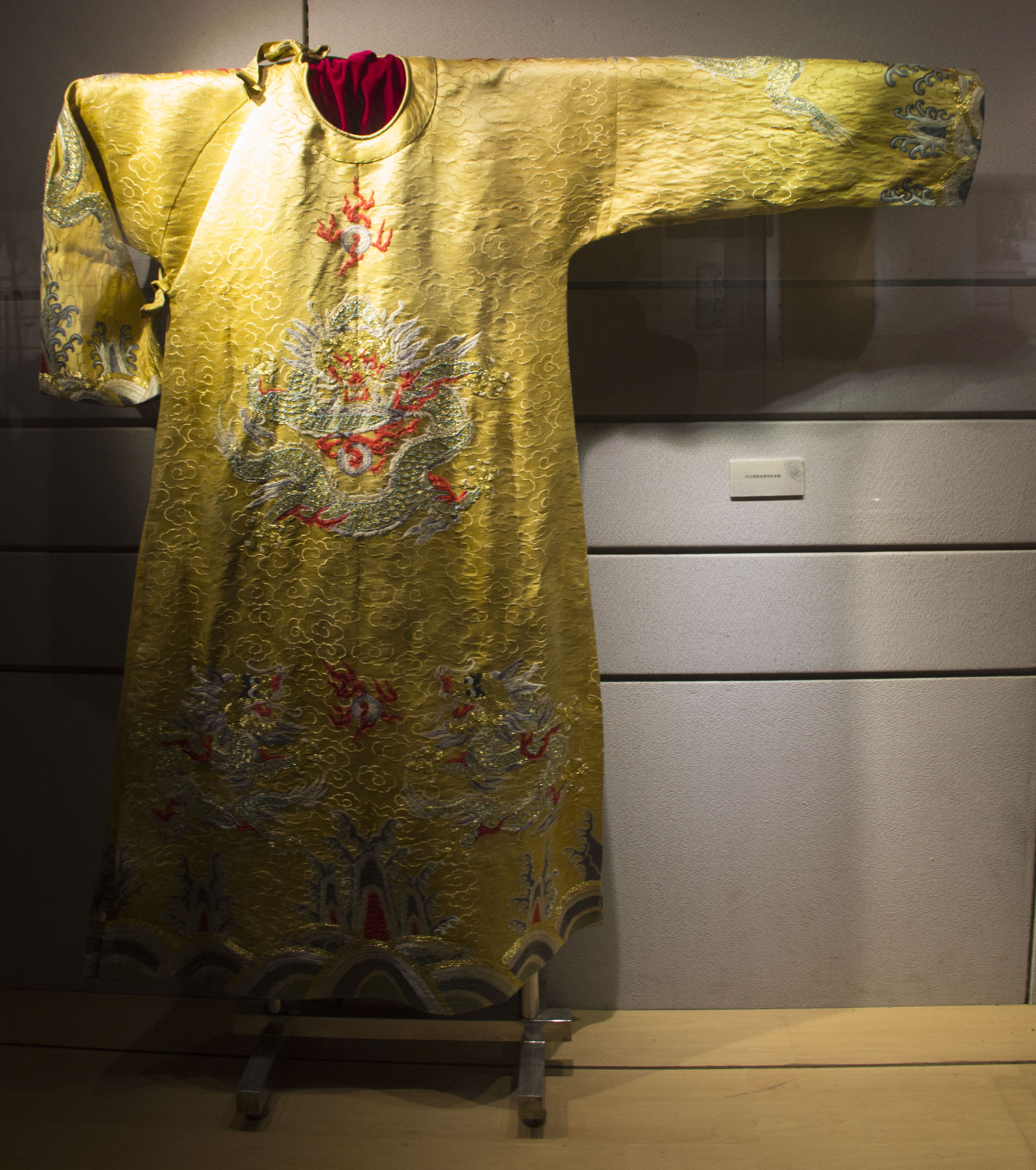
Dragon robe, Taiping Kingdom

In the Taiping Heavenly Kingdom, Qing dynasty's clothing and queue braids were opposed and forbidden on cultural and nationalistic grounds, as many in the Taiping Heavenly Kingdom were of Hakka descent who opposed the rule of Manchu. In an attempt to restore the identity of the Han Chinese, the Taiping rebels established their own clothing system, which introduced dedicated uniforms and features of Hakka fashion, removing characteristics of qizhuang such as the matixiu or horse-hoof cuffs and hats used by the Qing. The rebels let their hair grow, wearing headscarves or red turbans over them, while others kept their queues hidden under the turbans. Though many of the male fashion still retained many similarities with that of the Qing dynasty. The kings and princes of the Heavenly Kingdom were the only people allowed to wear yellow dragon robe.

At the same during the Taiping Rebellion, the Red Turban Rebellion broke out in the Guangdong region, whom among their leaders was the locally popular Red Boat Opera Company performer Li Wenmao. Due to opera costumes being exempt from the ban on hanfu, and opera's role in the vernacular culture and identity of the Han Chinese, many of the rebels dressed in opera costumes and organized themselves in roles similar to that of historical opera plays, with Li Wenmao himself supposedly donning the Ming dynasty mangfu. Newly selected civil and military officials also wore respective opera costumes of civil official and military character roles that were analogous to their stations. The clothing worn by Taiping Heavenly Kingdom were similarly based on confiscated or repurposed paofu from the opera stages, including the dragon robes worn by the leaders of the rebellion.

As a result, Ming dynasty style clothing was even retained in some places in China during the Xinhai Revolution in 1911 AD. In the late Qing dynasty, some members of the White Lotus sect cut down their queues in an act of defiance while most of them only remove a hair strand or unbraided their hair and let it loose. After the Qing dynasty was toppled in the 1911 Xinhai revolution, the Taoist dress and topknot was adopted by the ordinary gentry and "Society for Restoring Ancient Ways" (Fuguhui) on the Sichuan and Hubei border where the White Lotus and Gelaohui operated. It was only later westernized revolutionaries, influenced by western hairstyle who began to view the braid as backward and advocated adopting short haired western hairstyles.

===== Taoist and buddhist priests/monks =====
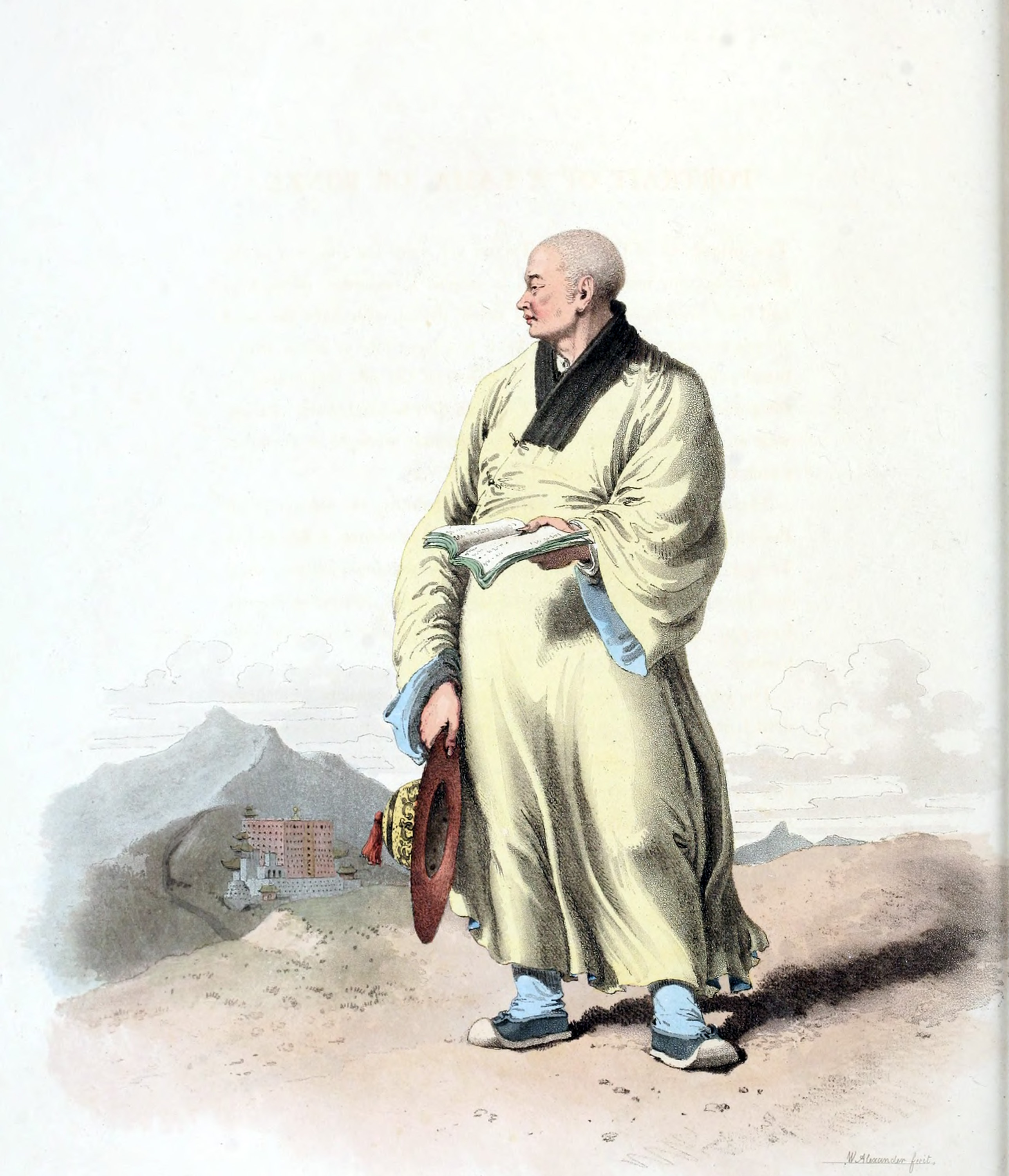
Portrait of a lama or a bonze, drawing by William Alexander, draughtsman of the Macartney Embassy to China in 1793.

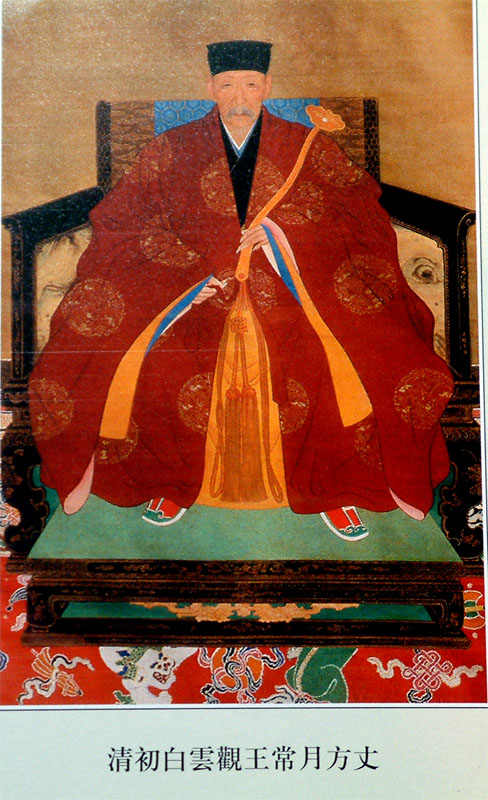
Wang Chanyue (?－1680 AD), seventh patriarch of the Longmen branch of the taoist school Quanzhen Dao, Qing dynasty.

Neither Taoist priests nor Buddhist monks were required to wear the queue by the Qing; they continued to wear their traditional hairstyles, completely shaved heads for Buddhist monks, and long hair in the traditional Chinese topknot for Taoist priests.

Taoist priests also continued to wear Taoist traditional dress and did not adopt Qing Manchu dress. Remains of the Ming dynasty subjects also invented various ways to preserve their hairstyle and their Han-style clothing (for example, in remote places). To avoid wearing the queue and shaving the forehead, the Ming loyalist Fu Shan became a Daoist priest after the Qing took over Taiyuan.

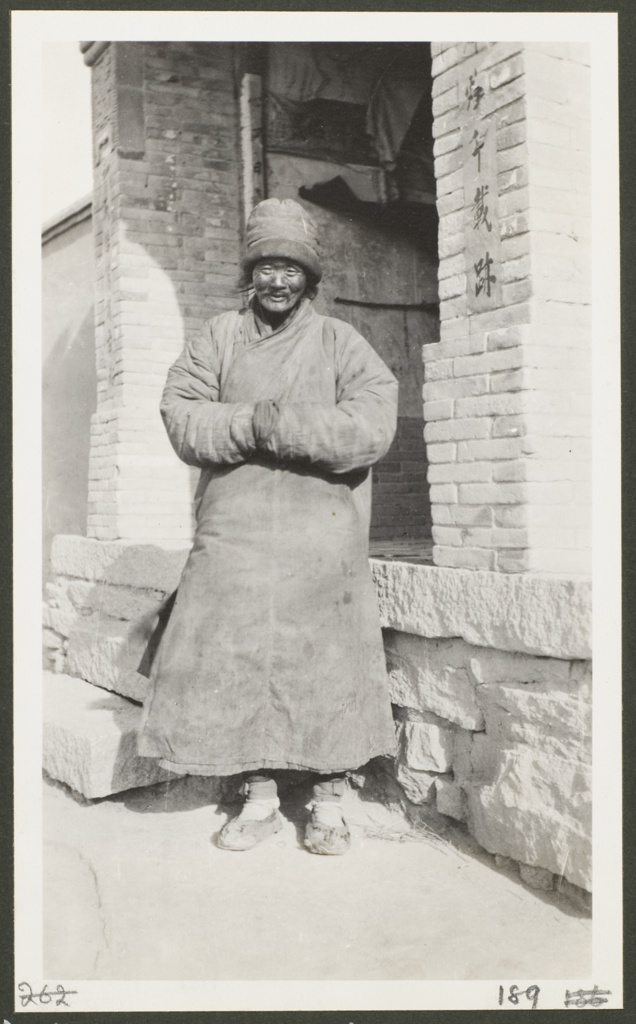
Taoist from 1910 wearing daopao.

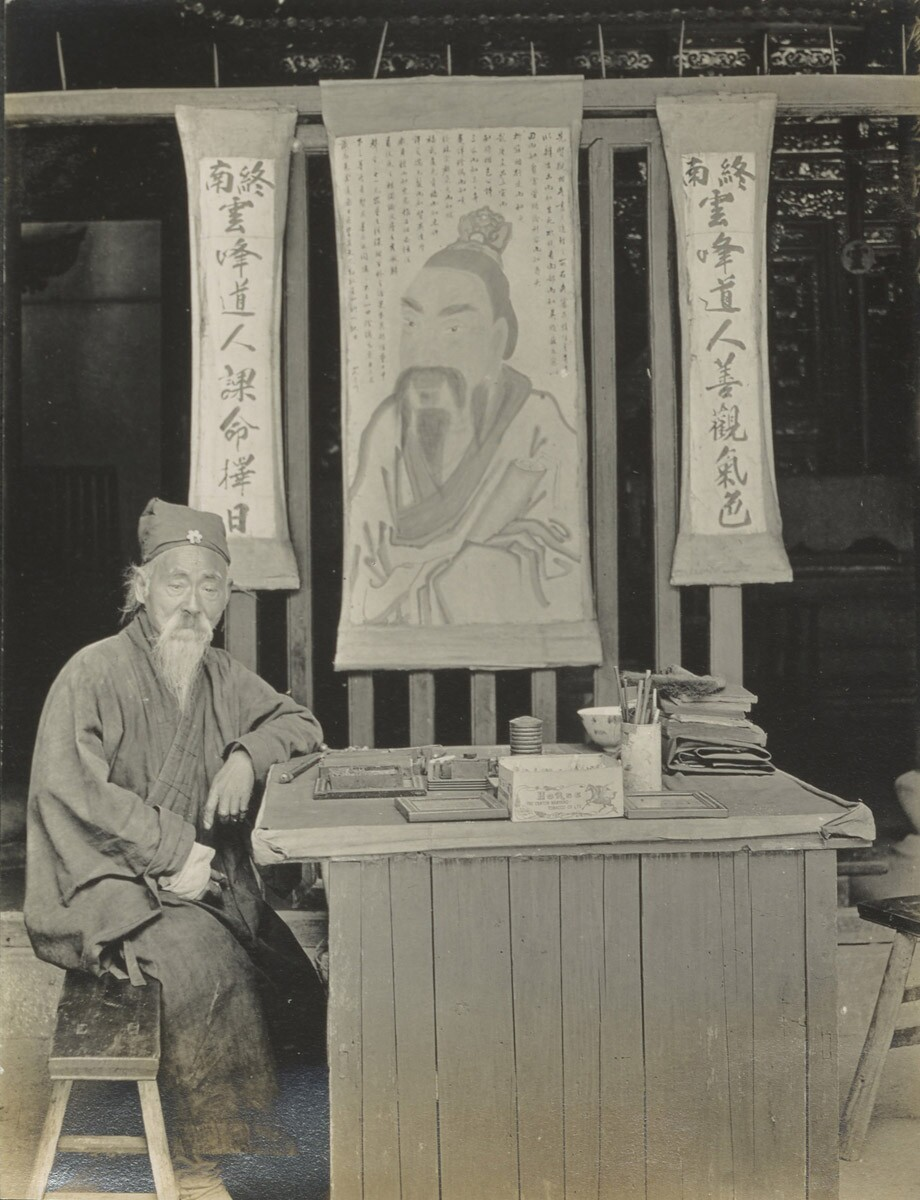
Fortune-teller sitting next to a table, 1908.

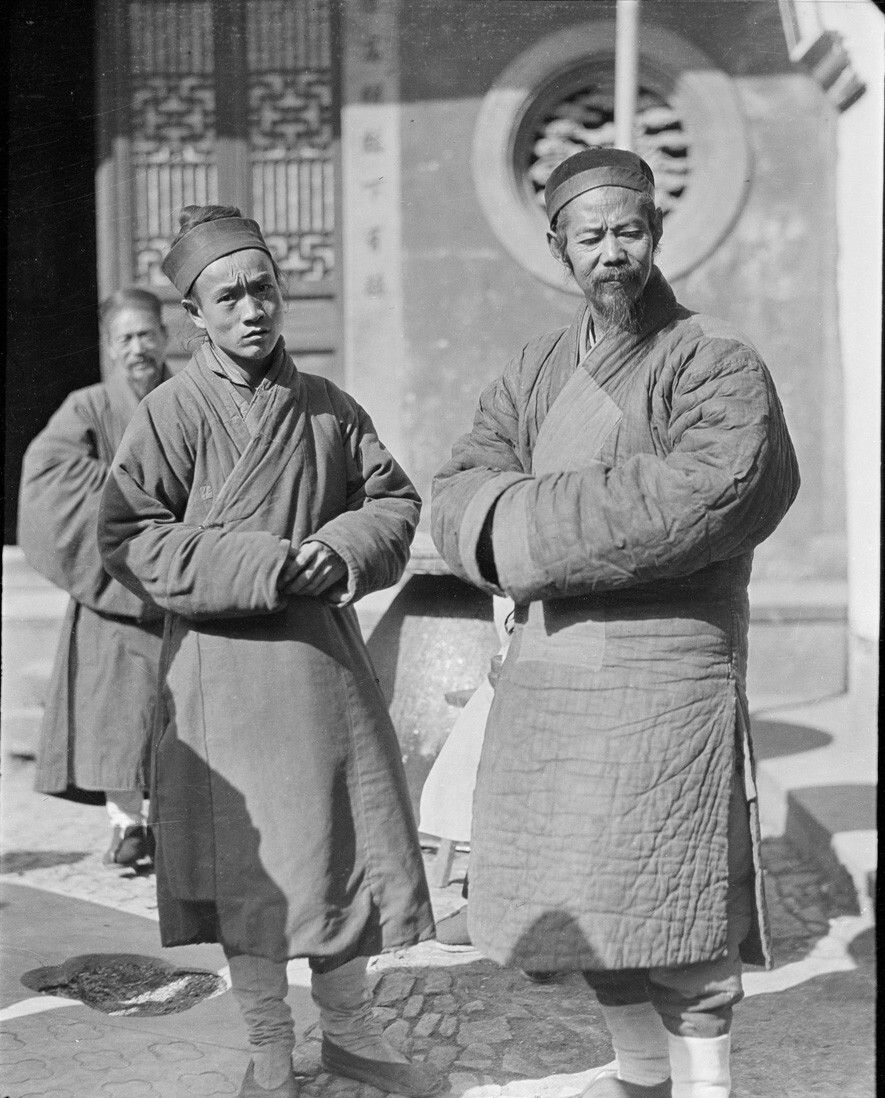
Taoist Priests of Fuxin Temple, 1919.

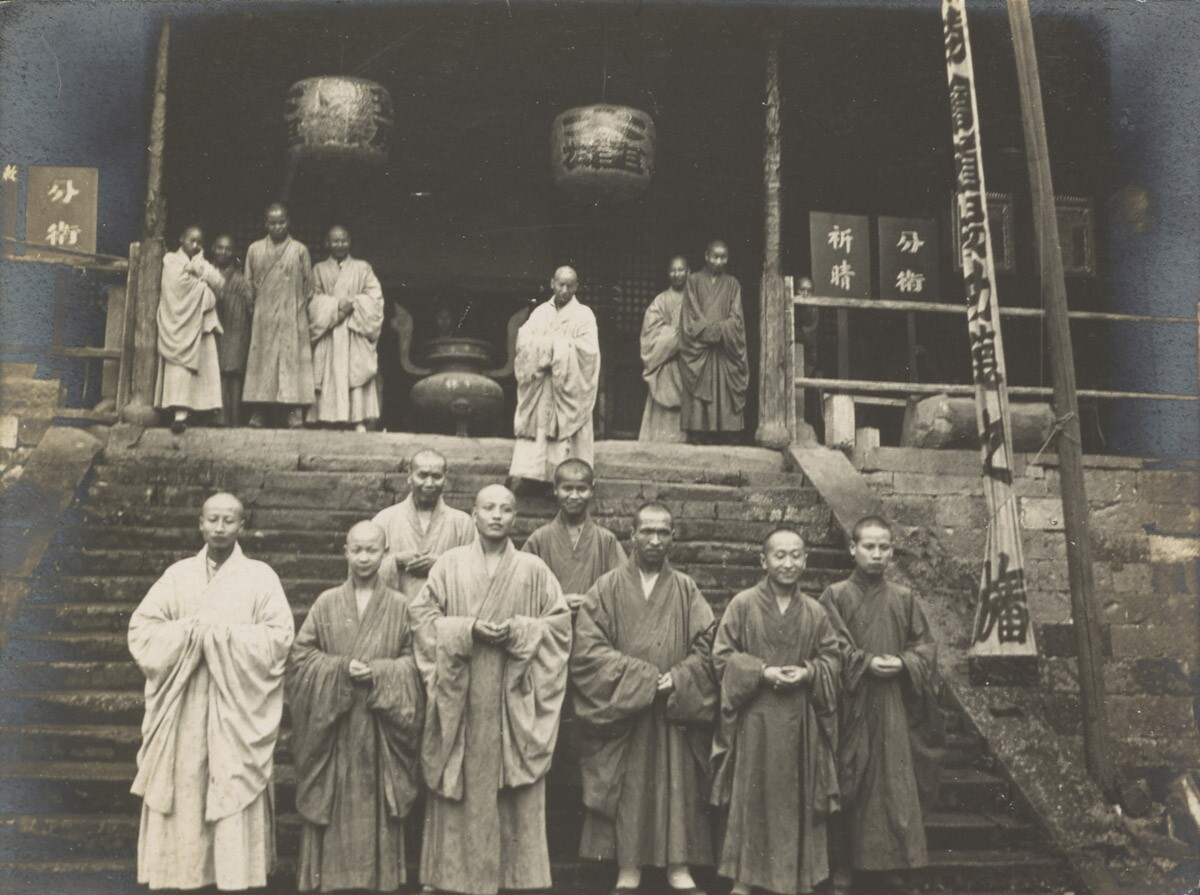
Buddhist monks on the steps of a temple building, 1908.

===== Burial practices =====
After death, their hair could also be combed into a topknot similar to the ones worn by the Han Chinese in Ming; a practice which was observed by the Europeans; men who were wealthy but held no official rank were allowed to be buried in a deep-blue silk shenyi which was edged with bright blue or white band. Men who were in mourning were also exempted; however, since the mourners were not allowed to wear topknot in accordance to the Confucian rites, the men simply untied their queues and left their loose hair dishevelled. Women from wealthy families could also be buried in a variation of shenyi called the bai shou yi (lit. "longevity jacket"), a deep blue or black ao with the character shou for longevity embroidered in gold all over the ao. The bai shou yi was worn with a white pleated skirt which was edged with blue satin; the skirt was embroidered with the many blue shou character.

===== Chinese opera and drama performers =====
The ban of Hanfu also did not apply to performers who wore and displayed Hanfu-style costumes when performing dramas.

===== Women's clothing =====
For women's clothing, Manchu and Han fashions of clothing coexisted. The Han Chinese women carefully maintained their pure Han Chinese ethnicity and did not wear Manchu clothing. Throughout the Qing dynasty, Han women continued to wear clothing from Ming dynasty; however, with time, the Ming dynasty customs started to be forgotten and influence from the Manchu started to influence the women's clothing. Yet, Manchu women and Han Chinese women never emulated each other's clothing; and as a result, by the end of the nineteenth century, Manchu and Han Chinese women had maintained distinctive clothing.

At the beginning of the Qing dynasty, Han Chinese women were expected to continue the Han Chinese clothing of the Ming dynasty. Manchu women wore a long, one-piece robe with a curving robe whereas Han Chinese women continued to wear the combination upper and lower garment. As Han Chinese women were not forced to change in to Manchu clothing, most of the clothing elements of the Han Chinese women in the Qing dynasty continued to follow the style of the Ming dynasty's ao coat. Following the Ming dynasty customs, Han Chinese women would wear ruqun and aoqun, which was a popular fashion in the Qing dynasty. Trousers were sometimes worn under the skirts if they were commoners or unmarried. Han Chinese women, who were unmarried or were peasants, would wear shanku without any overskirt. Wearing skirts were generally considered a symbol of maturity and was reserved for married women.

In the middle of the Qing dynasty, Manchu and Han Chinese women started to influence each other's clothing; however, they still maintain the uniqueness of their respective clothing styles. The late Qing dynasty, Han Chinese women in the gentry and aristocratic classes started to imitate the clothing of the Manchu; similarly, the Manchu women started to imitate the clothing of the Han Chinese women; and thus, they influenced each other.

In the late Qing dynasty, Han Chinese's ao continued to share some similarities with the ao worn in the Ming dynasty. However, the clothing worn by the Han Chinese women was also influenced by Manchu culture to some degree; for example, in terms of clothing colour, embroidery and binding. The late Qing dynasty ao had large sleeves, a slant opening and was waist-length. Elderly Chinese women wore an ao with round standing collar, which had a planket by the right, flat sleeves, sleeves which were wrist-length and had a wide cuff. The collar of the Han Chinese ao may be standing collar or low collar stand, and there were slits on both sides of the ao. The waist-length ao could also have narrow sleeves and a front opening. Women clothing in the late Qing dynasty also had piped edges.

The silk skirts which are indigenous to Han Chinese women are a representative garment of the Qing dynasty clothing. A popular form of skirts during the Qing dynasty was the mamianqun, a skirt made of two separate pieces of fabric which are not sewn together from the waistline to the hemline; this skirt allowed women with bounded feet to walk with greater ease. The mamianqun had very subtle changes in both the cut and decorations throughout the Qing dynasty. Other Han Chinese women skirts which were popular in the Qing dynasty were the baijianqun (百襇裙; hundred pleated skirt), the yuehuaqun (月華裙; moonlight skirt) which was popular in the early Qing, the phoenix tail skirt which was popular during the reign of Kangxi and Qianlong, and the ‘fish-scale’ skirt. At the end of the Qing dynasty, a skirt decorated with sword-shaped ribbons with bells hanging at the sharp corner appear. Han Chinese women also wore dudou, which was developed from the Ming dynasty dudou.

Outside China in 1911, the magazine Vogue recommended shopping for a set of attire called "boudoir set" which consisted of the Qing dynasty aoqun with wide hems and wide sleeves, and shoes. However, by the Xinhai revolution in 1911, the wide hemmed and wide sleeved Qing dynasty aoqun was no more popular among urban Han Chinese women in China; instead they started to make their clothing narrower. Ready-to-wear Western clothing had little popularity among Chinese consumers as due to proportion misfit of Western clothing.

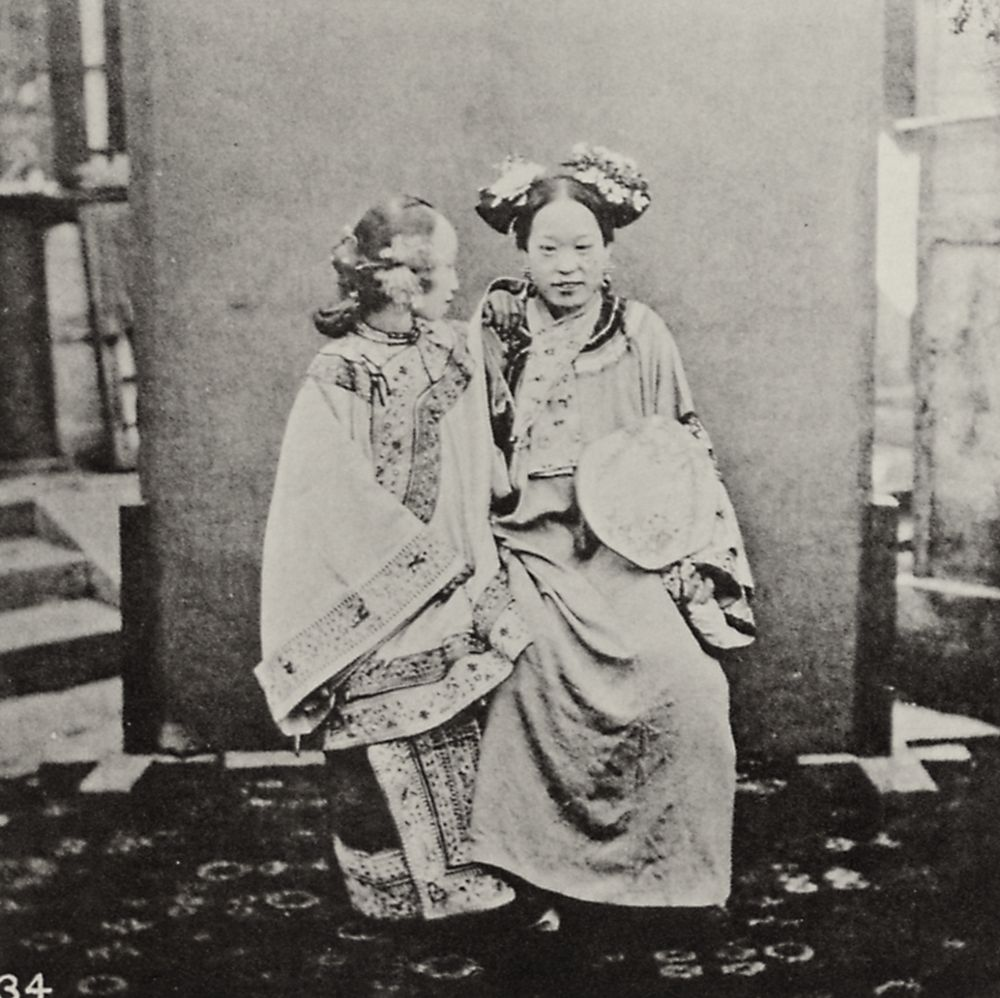
On the left, a Han Chinese woman wearing Han Chinese clothing composed of an ao and a skirt; on the right, a Manchu woman wearing a one-piece long robe, which is the precursor of the qipao.

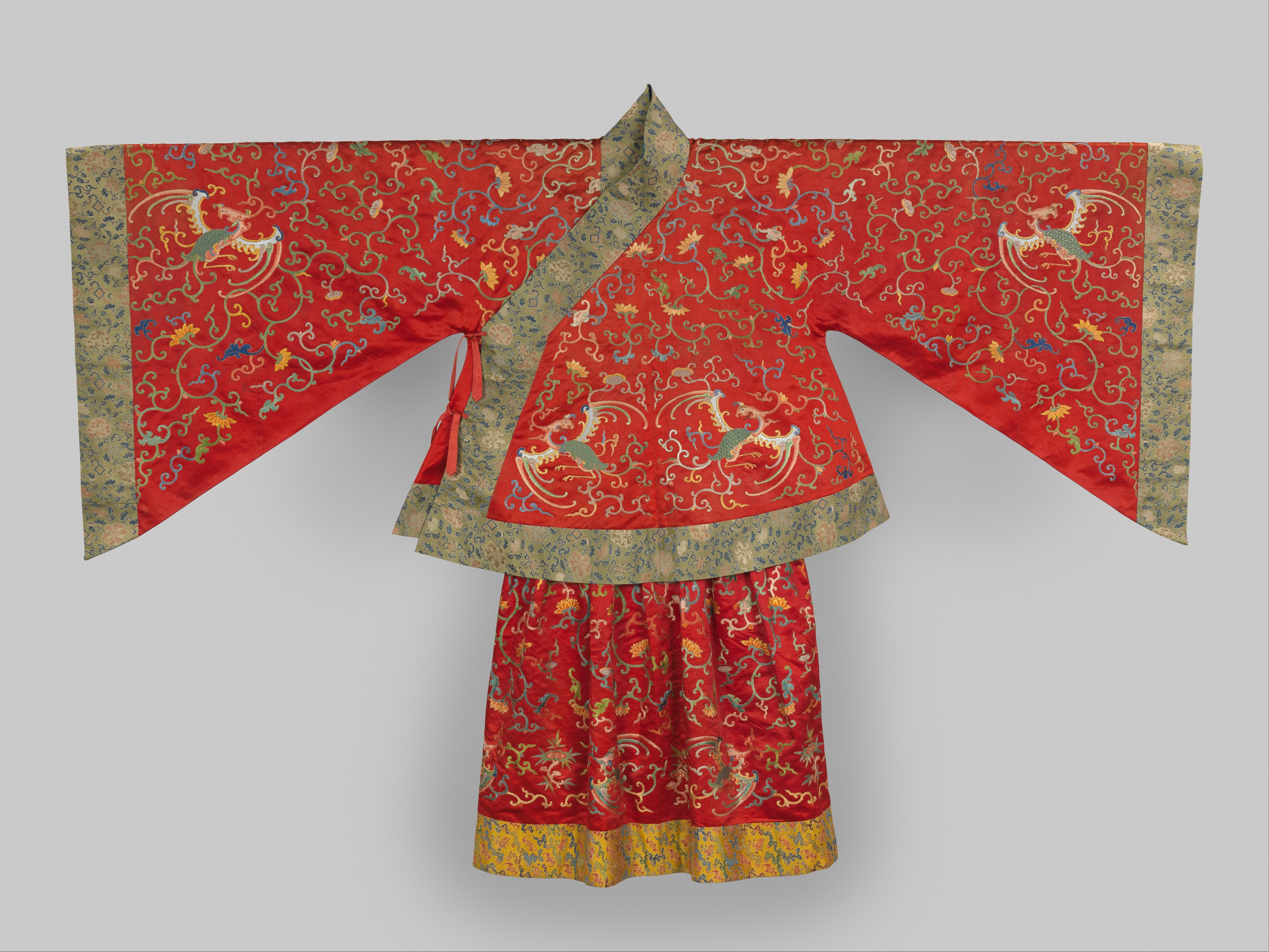
Qing dynasty aoqun worn in theatre for female role, 18th century.

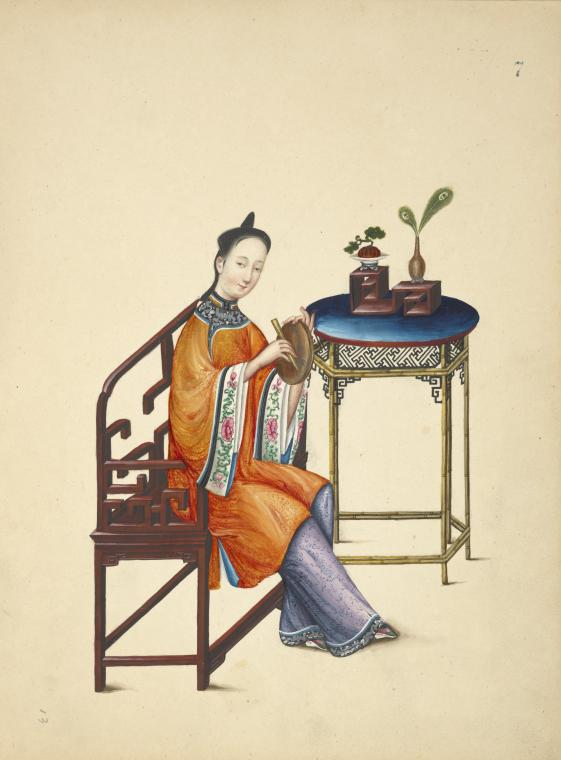
A woman dressed in an ao and a trousers, she is playing a small drum, from 1800.

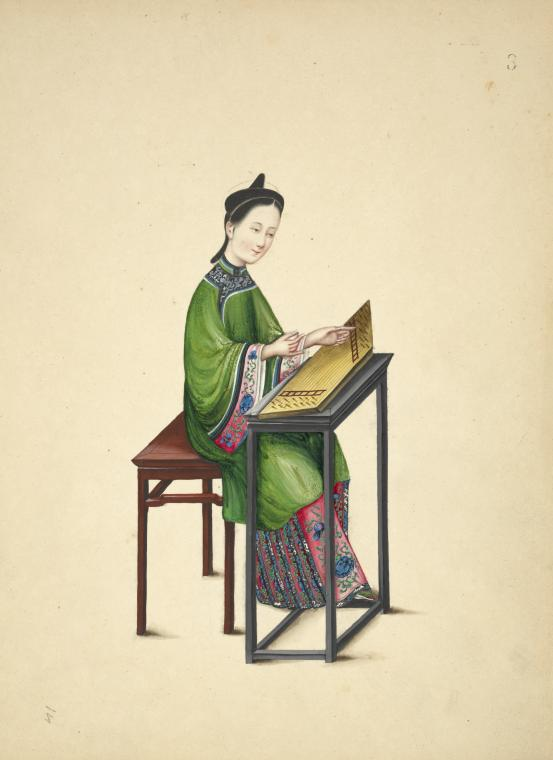
A woman wearing an ao with a long skirt, Playing a zheng, from 1800.

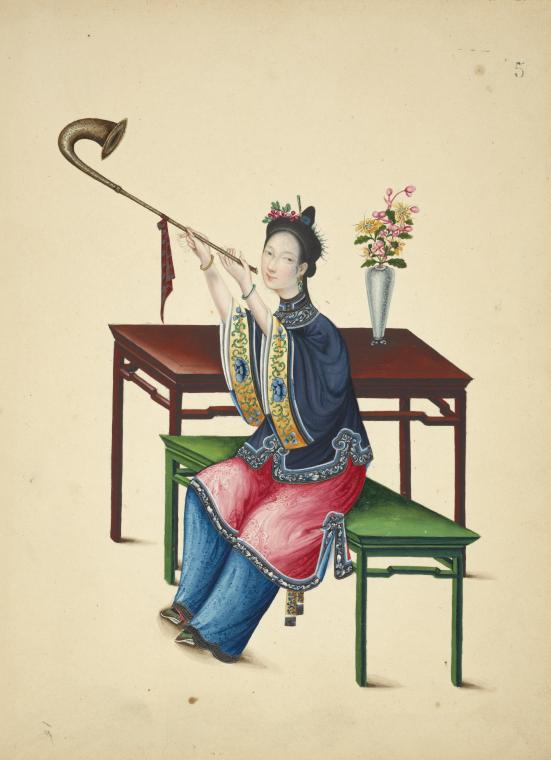
A woman wearing an ao and trousers under an overskirt, she is playing a wind instrument with a curved bell, from 1800.

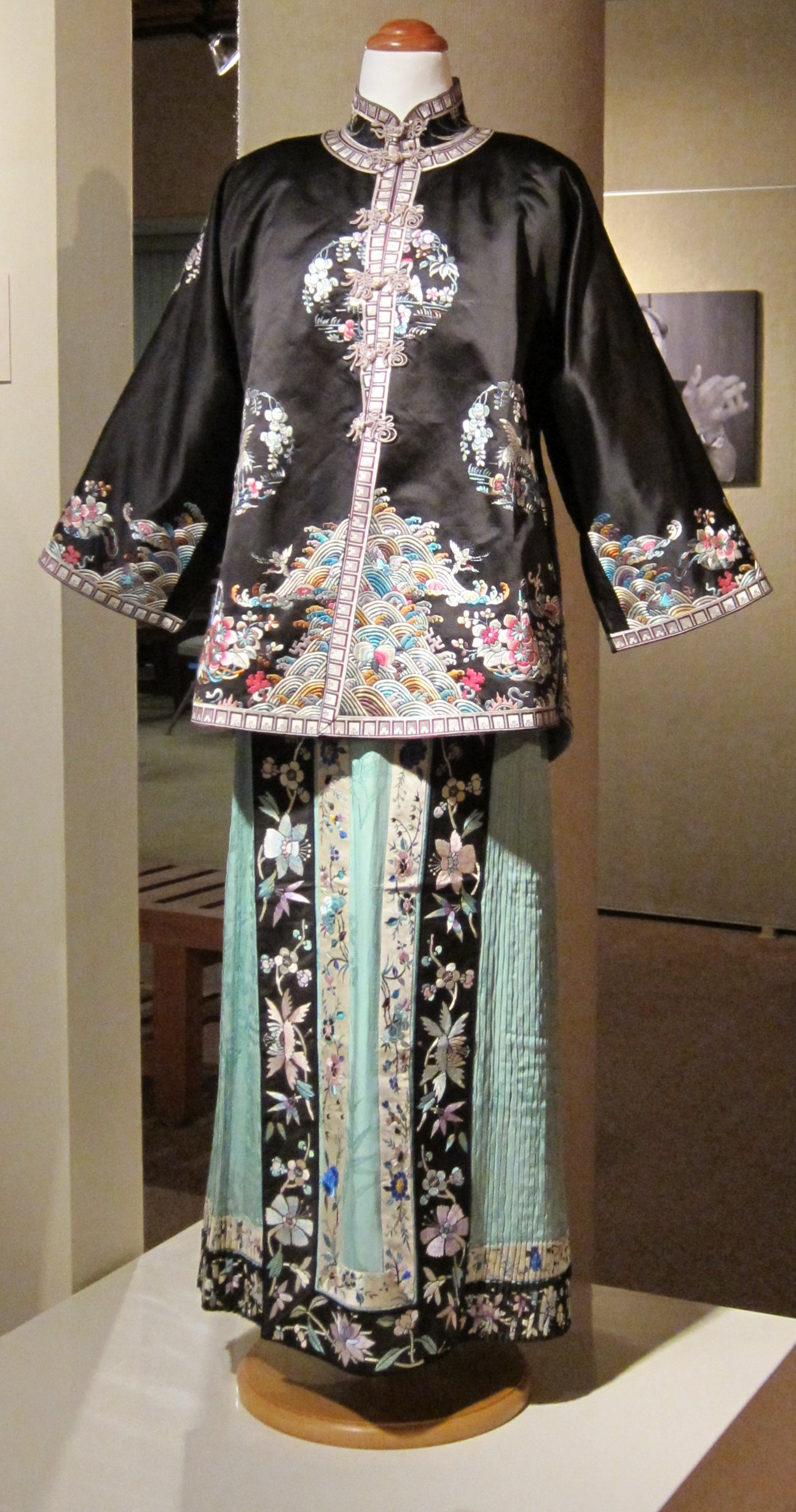
Han Chinese embroidered silk lady's jacket and pleated skirt, c. 1900.

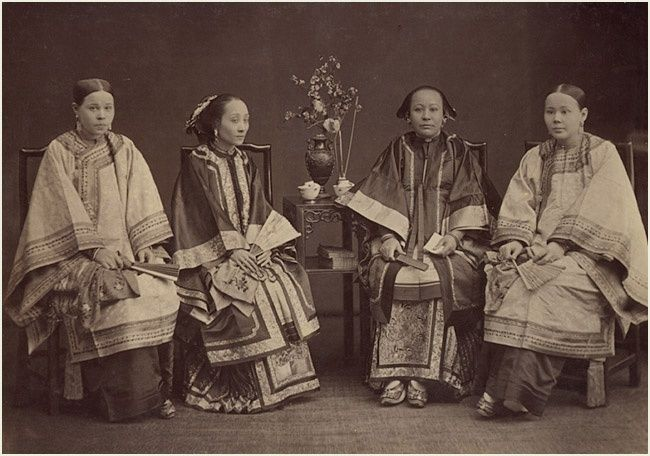
The clothing of Han women during the 19th century. The top ao from Ming dynasty was changed into a variation of the Manchu qizhuang, while skirt, which inherited the Ming style, was also influenced by Qing-style patterns.

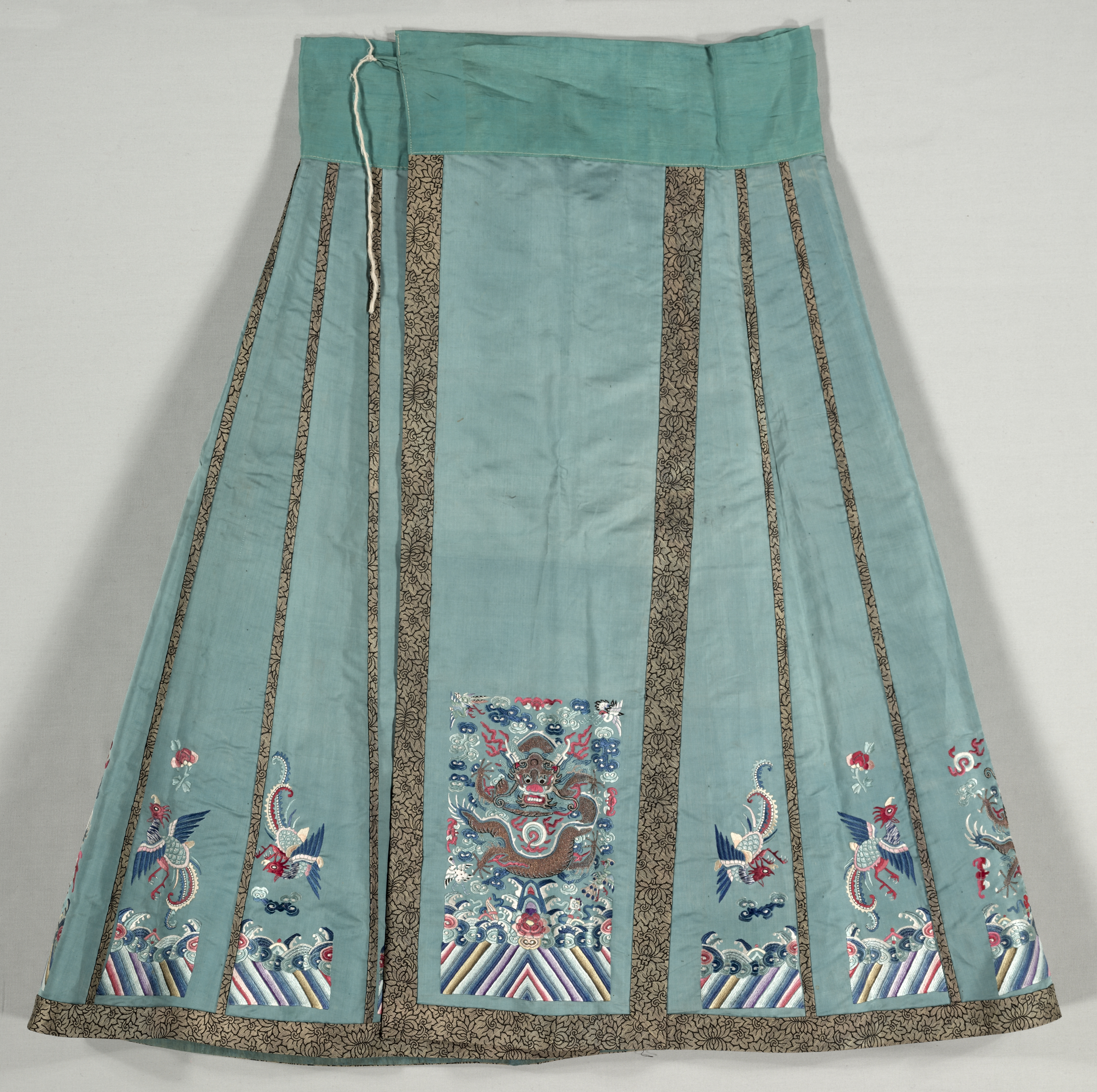
Qing Dynasty pleated skirt; late 19th century

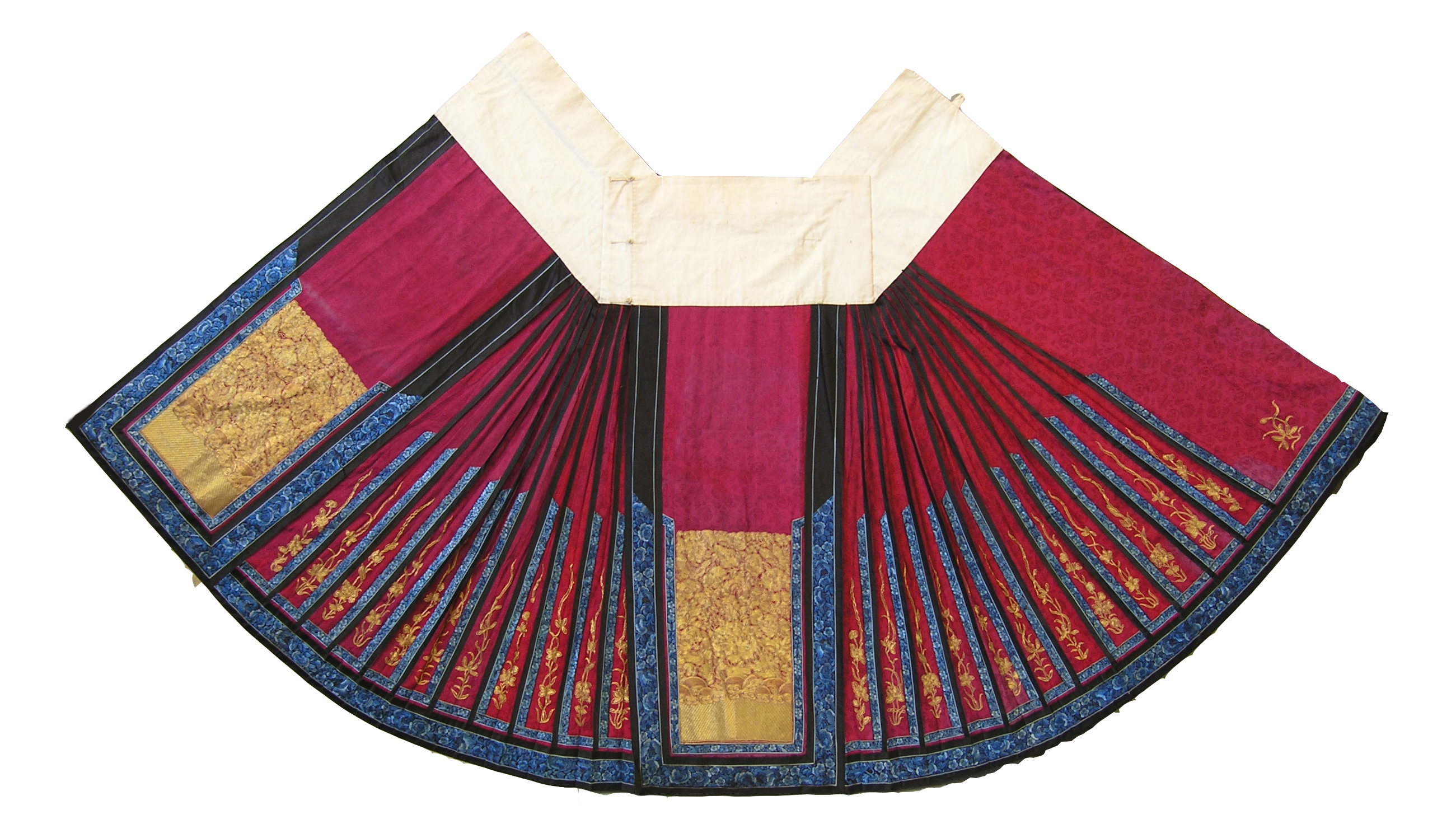
Woman's two panels skirt, Qing dynasty (1644–1912), Late 19th Century-Early 20th Century.

===== Children =====
Infants would wear dudou, which was embroidered with luck charms, as their only clothing in hot summer months until they reach the age of two to three years old. Han Chinese children were spared from the tifayifu policy and could be dressed in Hanfu; their clothing was fastened to the right side in the Ming dynasty–style. Their daily clothing was made of silk, and they would wear satin and silk clothing for special occasions; the colours of the clothing were bright and the clothing were typically red and pink as these were auspicious colours.

They also wore a baijiayi in the Qing dynasty to wish a child good fortune and as a protection from evil, as well as different style of hats, such as the "rice bowl hat", the "tiger head hat", and the "dog head hat", which aim to protect against evil spirits and later on to attract good fortune when they have to take important examinations.

== 20th century ==
In 1912 AD, the Republic of China was established and government ministers were required to western-style clothing. Official attire for both men and women were regulated and published in the government gazettes; the men had to wear western-style clothing on formal days and evening, and in informal time, they could wear either Western suit or changshan magua. Women had to wear Qing style aoqun Women started to wear more western-style clothing, Foot binding was legally abolished.

During the early years of the republic, cutting off the queue was a pre-requisite for provincial election votes, and in 1914, policemen cut off the queue of any anyone arrested wearing queues.

After the fall of the Qing dynasty, Yuan Shikai revived the Sacrifice at the Temple of Heaven ceremony; he also proclaimed himself as Emperor Hongxian and the beginning of a new dynasty; the robe and hat which specially designed for him to wear on the day of this ceremony was based on the ceremonial dress worn by the Han and Ming dynasty emperors on sacrificial ceremonies. However, Yuan Shikai did not adhere to the Han dynasty and Ming dynasty fashion completely and these gowns showed differences in design, i.e. the use of roundels. A manual, called the Jisi guanfutu (祭祀冠服圖; The Illustrated Manual of Dress for Ritual Sacrifices), was specially prepared and produced in 1914 AD by the Zhengshitang lizhiguan (政事堂禮制館; Bureau of Rites of the Executive Affairs department); this manual provided a detailed description of the attire worn by Yuan Shikai and the participants of the ceremony on this 1914 public, ceremonial event. Yuan Shikai's ceremonial gown was jiaoling youren (i.e. fastened over the right side), made of black satin which was bordered with gold brocade and was decorated with twelve roundels which depicted the full twelve Imperial symbols (shier zhang; 十二章). Officials gowns were also designed for officials who had to participate in the ceremony; the officials gown were made of black satin and the edges were made with blue brocade.Laws regarding the official dress were also decreed:

1. First-rank officials had to wear nine roundels with nine symbols on their gowns;
2. Second-rank officials had to wear seven roundels with seven symbols;
3. Third-rank officials had to wear five roundels with five symbols;
4. Fourth-rank officials had to wear three roundels with three symbols; and
5. Fifth-rank officials and below had to wear a robe without any borders and without any roundels.

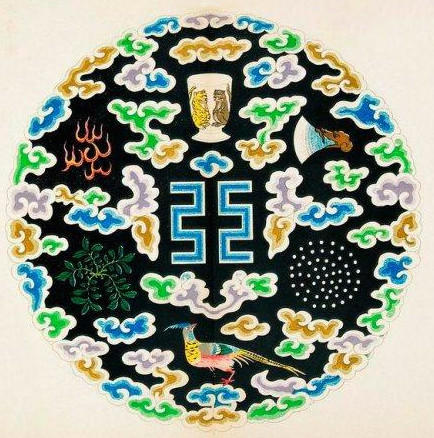
Seventh rank roundel emblem on ceremonial robes.

Those imperial emblems which were used in the roundels originated from the twelve emblems which were documented in the Shangshu. This ceremonial gown was worn over a purple satin apron skirt which would be edged with either blue or gold brocade; a belt of matching colour was also worn around the waist. They also wore flat hats, and some of them had string of pearls which hung over their faces just like the hats which were worn by the Han Chinese emperors of the earlier dynasties. Yuan Shikai's deliberate way of dressing up to pay respect to Heaven was not only made in accordance to the old imperial traditions, but it can also be considered as a public declaration to the Chinese people and to the world that the old Chinese customs were still relevant in modern society. When Yuan Shikai died in 1916, he was buried in imperial gown which was decorated with nine golden dragons. However, since his reign was short-lived, the attempts at restoring ancient Chinese ceremonial and official gowns failed and gradually disappeared.

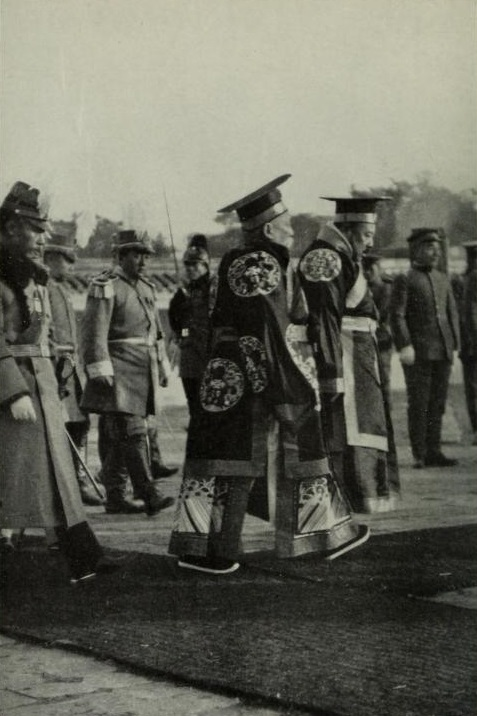
Picture of Emperor Yuan Shikai.

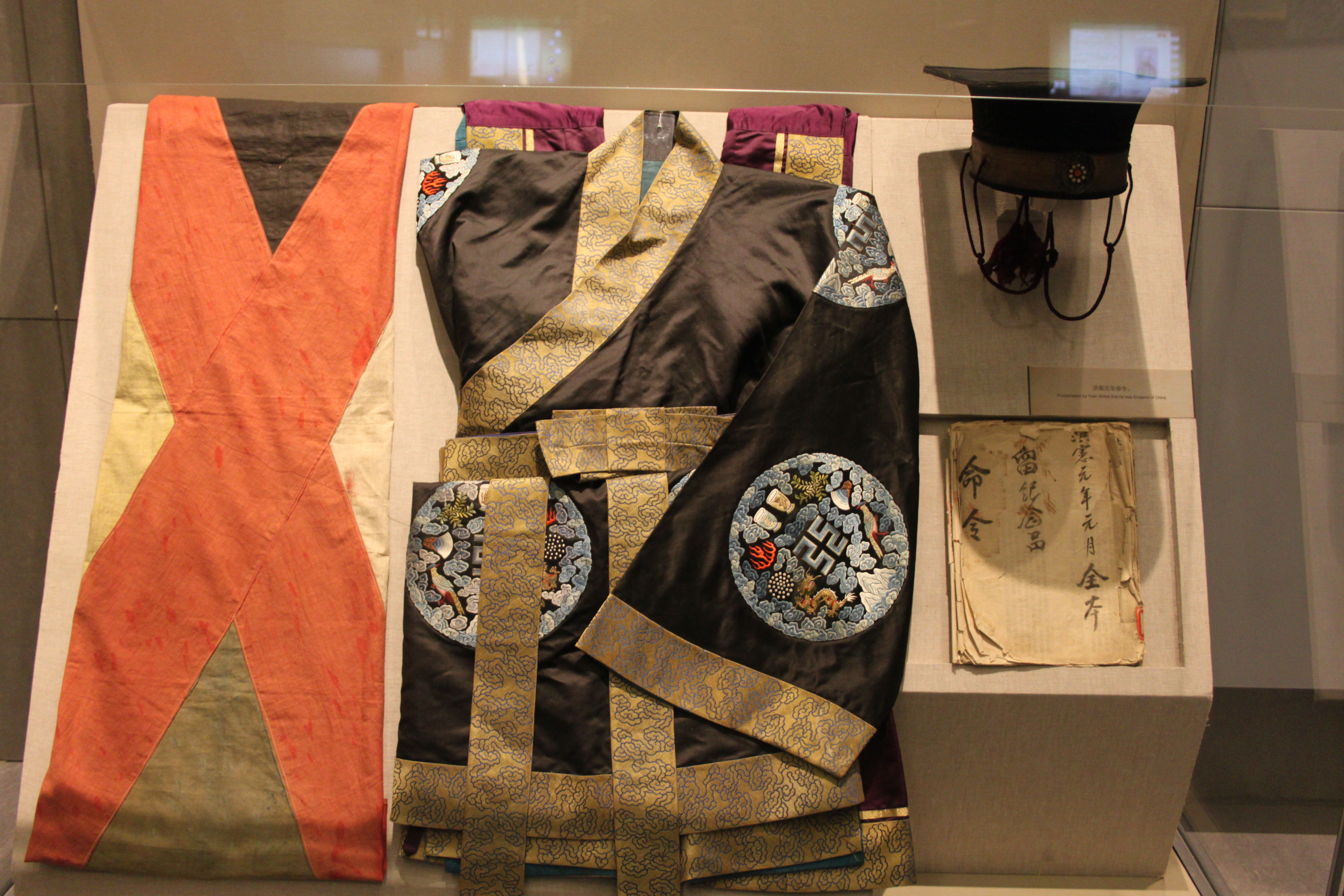
Ceremonial garments of Yuan Shikai.

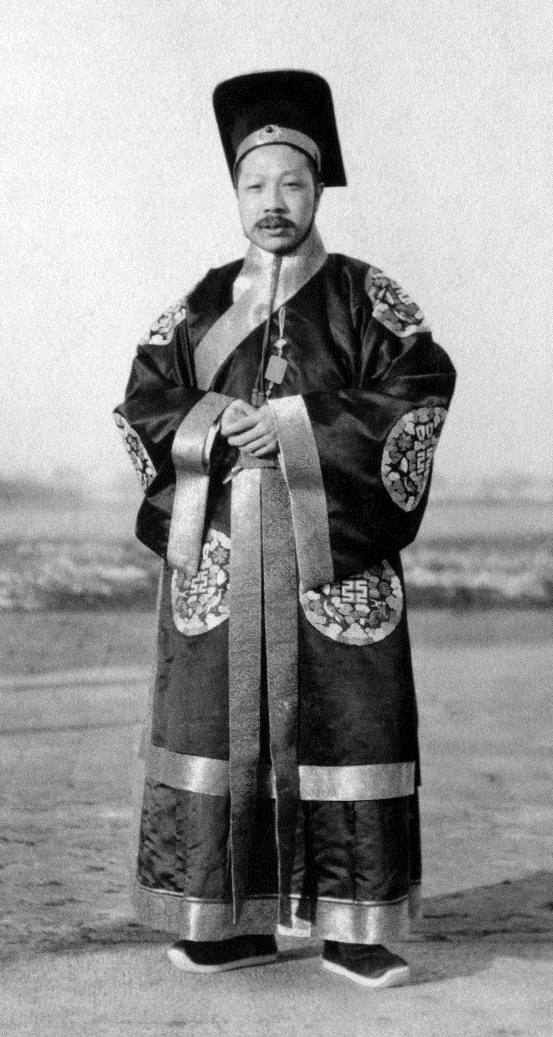
Third-rank Official at Yuan Shikai's visit to the sacrificial ceremony at the Temple of Heaven; he is wearing a robe with five roundels.

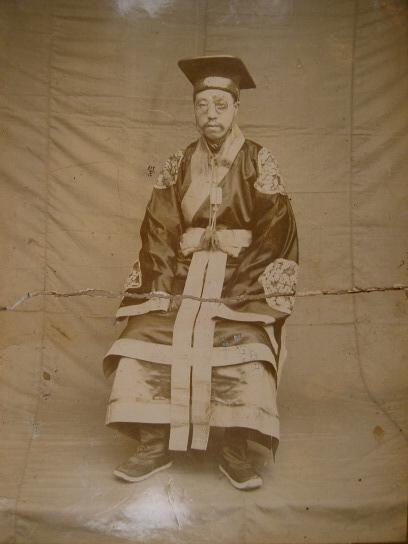
Official wearing sacrificial clothing.

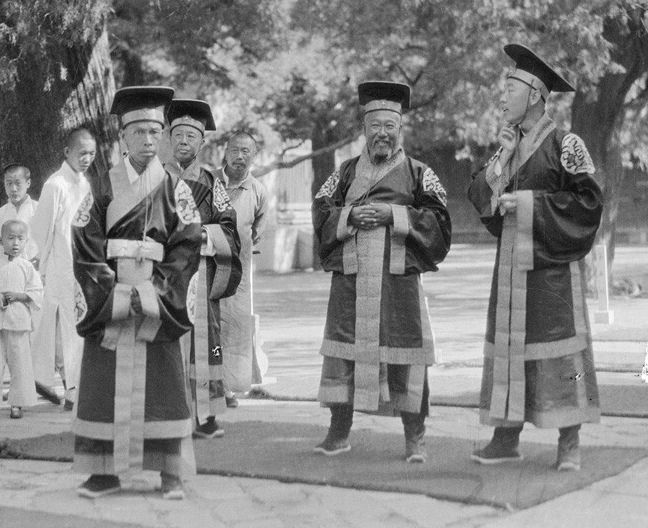
Men in ceremonial garments at Confucian Temple of Beijing, 1924 to 1927.

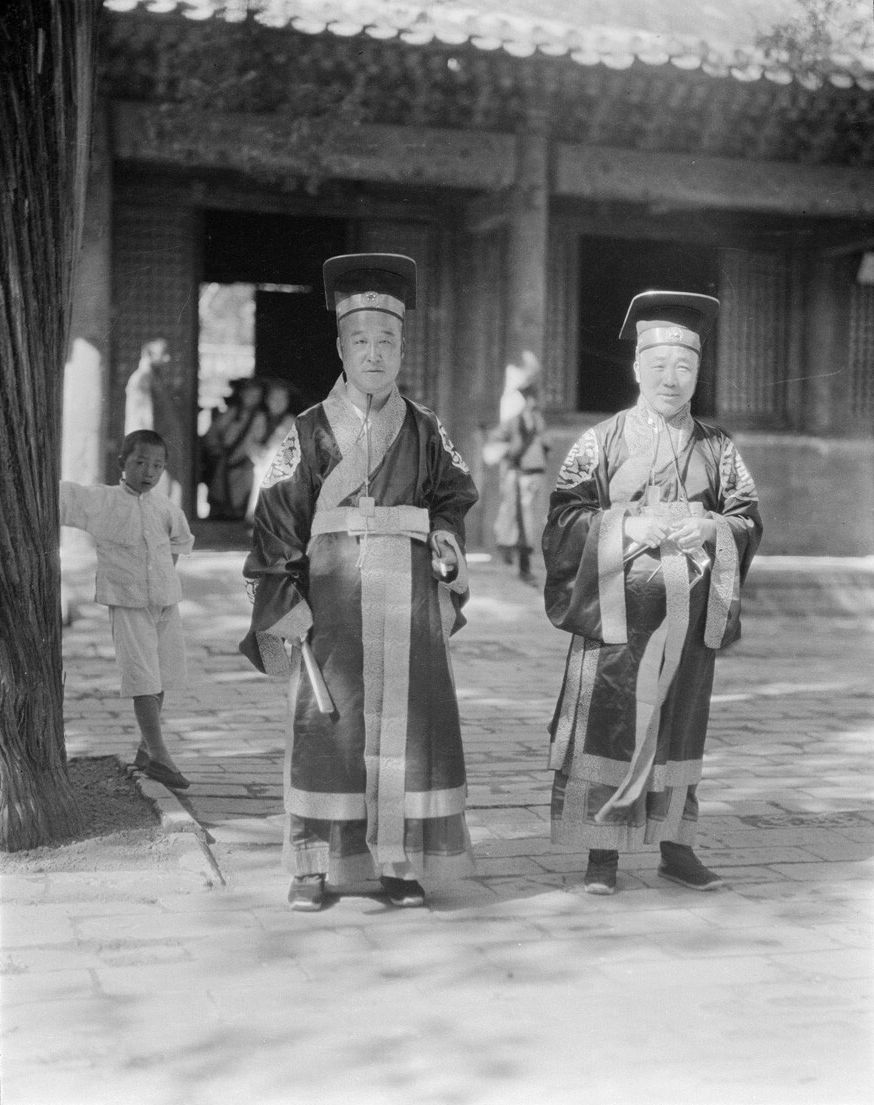
Priests at Confucian Temple of Beijing, 1924 to 1927

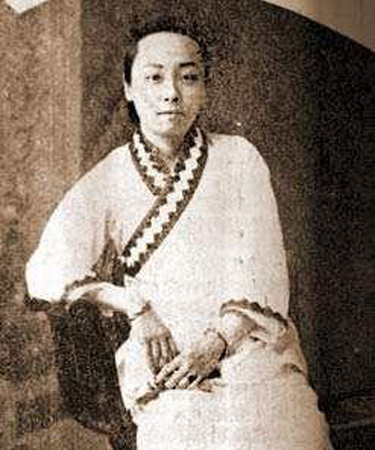
Sai Jinhua wearing a jiaoling youren clothing, 1920s.

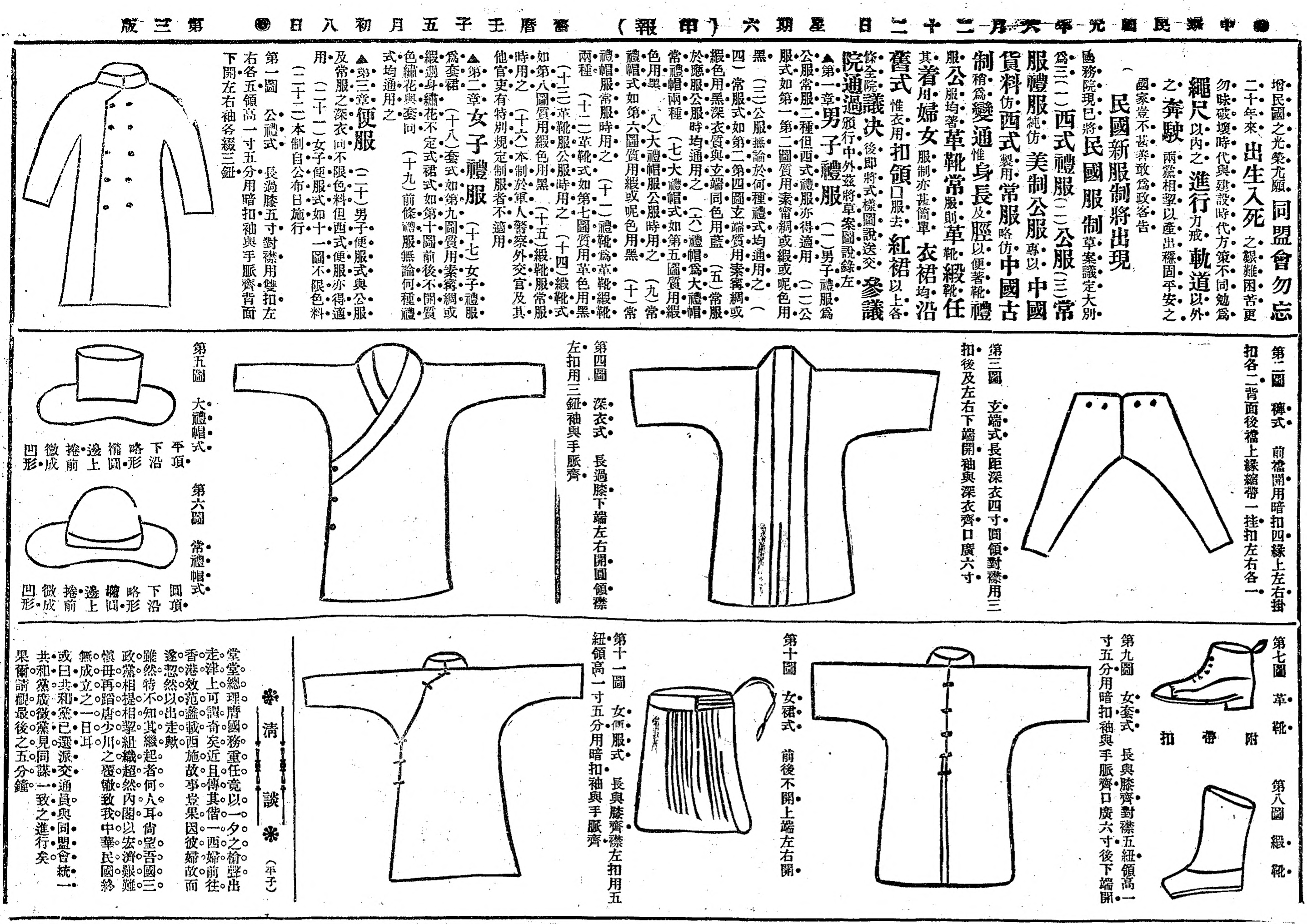
Newspaper announcement for new national official attire, including clothing based on shenyi and xuanduan, from Shenbao (申報) 1912.06.22

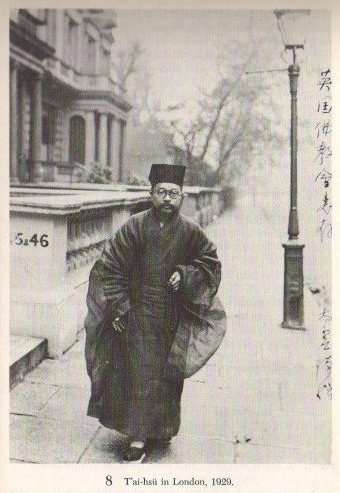
Eminence Taixu, a buddhist monk, wearing a youren gown in the streets of London, 1929.

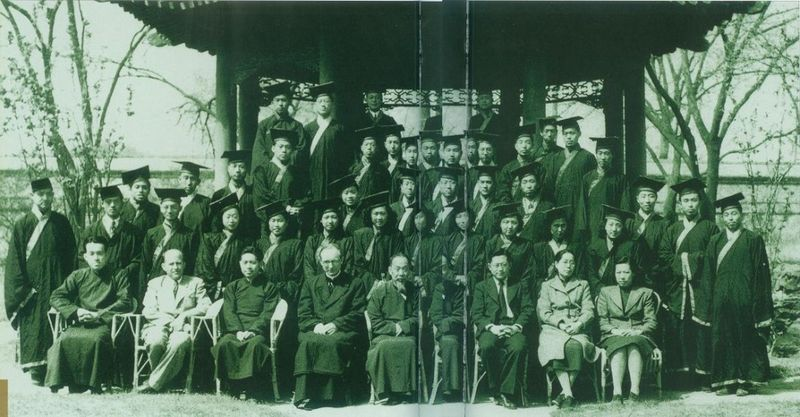
Graduate of the Fu Jen Catholic University, 1947

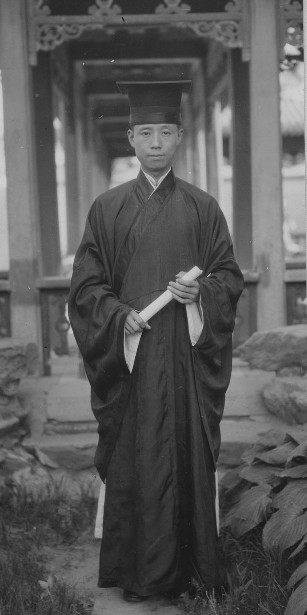
Graduate of Yenching University, 1930.

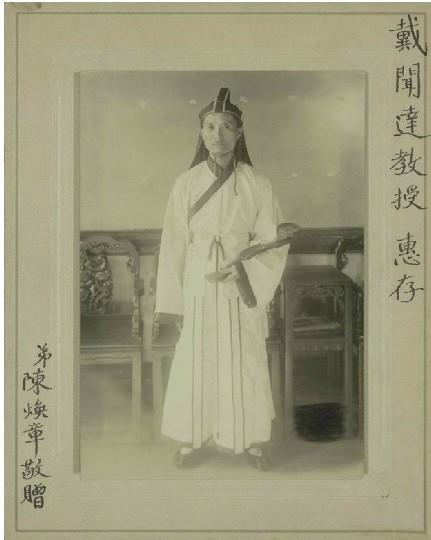
Dr. Chen Huanzhang (1880–1933), founder of the Confucian Academy, wearing shenyi.

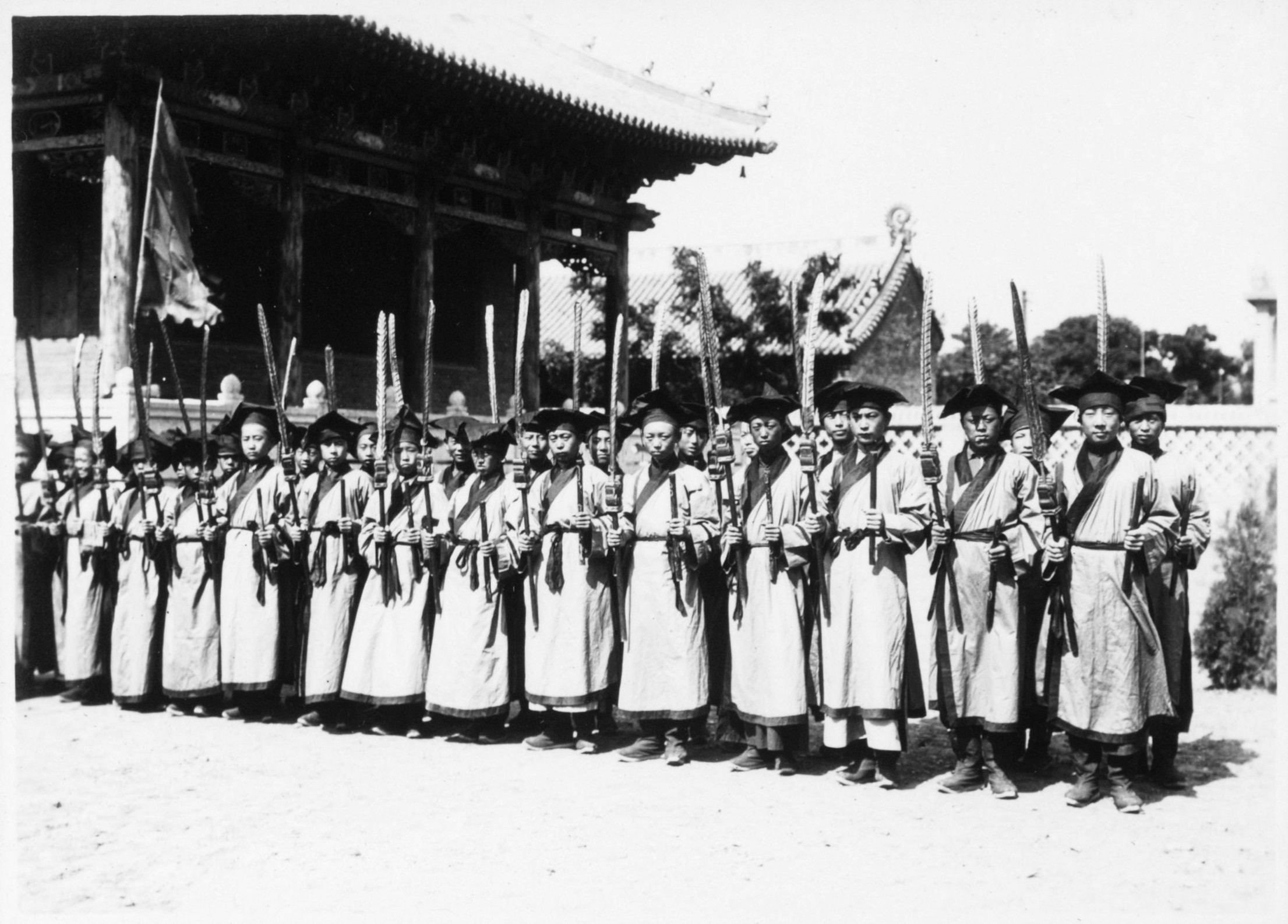
Hanfu worn during a ceremony at Jinzhou Confucian Temple.

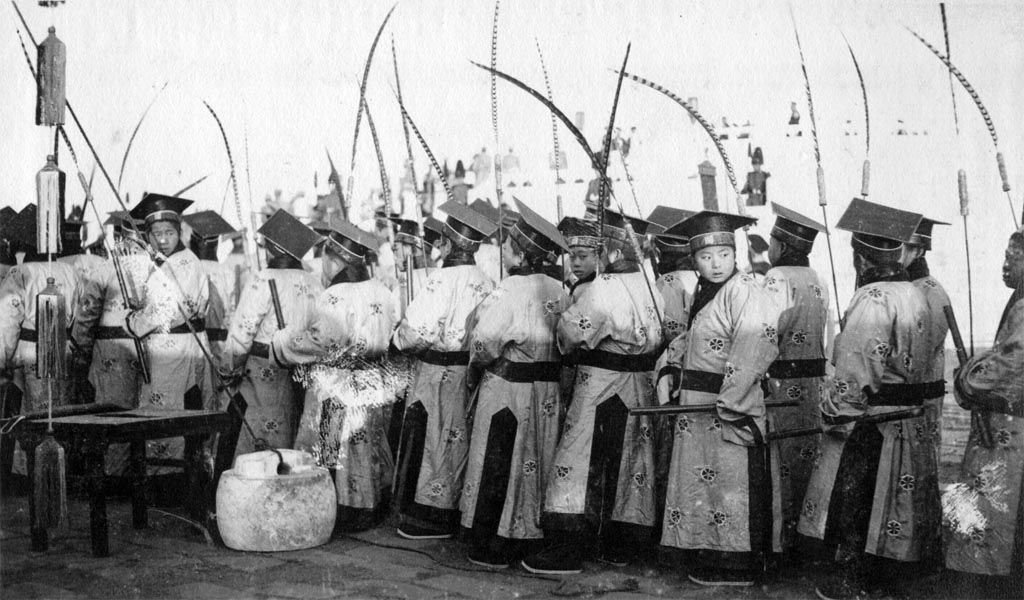
People wearing hanfu and mian at the official ceremony held at Beijing at 23 December 1914.

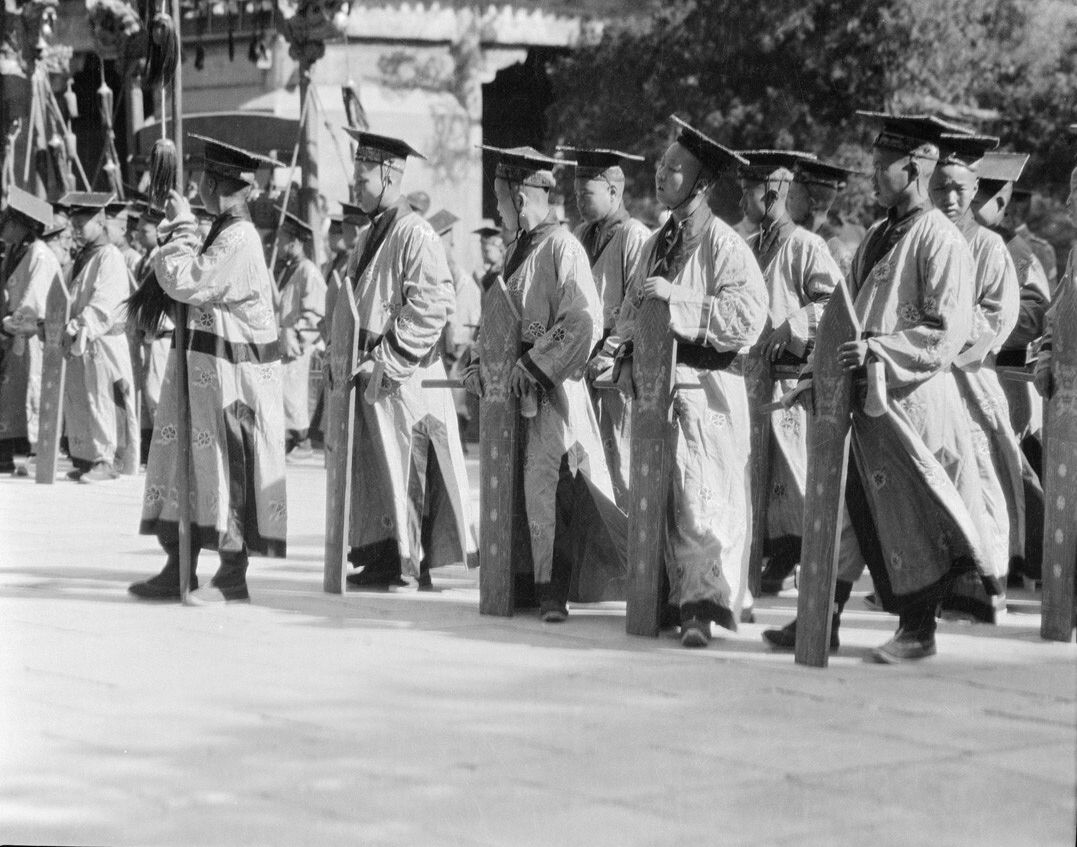
Confucian Shield & Ap Dancers wearing hanfu at official ceremony at Beijing, 1924 to 1927.

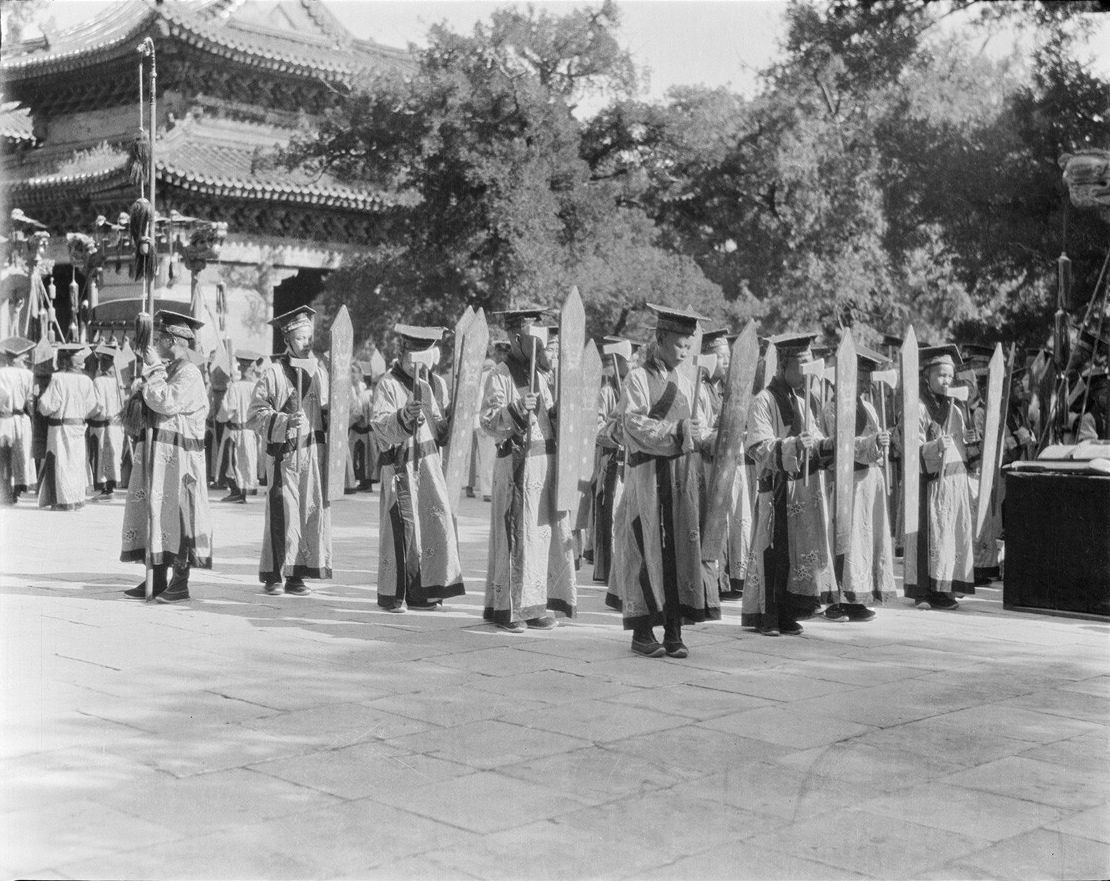
Confucian Shield & Ap Dancers wearing hanfu at official ceremony at Beijing, 1924 to 1927.

In 1919, women aoqun evolved; the ao became slimmer and longer until it reached below the narrow; the sleeves became narrower to the wrists, and the side slits were shortened; the collars became very high with some corners turning down sometimes and other collars reaching up to the ears. The edges of the ao became narrow contrasting to the wide bands of embroidery which was popular in the past. The ao was worn with a one-piece ankle length skirt.

In the early 1920s, the ao became more fitted and was shortened reaching only the top of the hip with a rounded hem, the sleeves were also shortened to three quarter of its length. The skirt became plainer, cut with a simple flared style, and wide waistband was replaced by narrow band in which a cord or elastic was threaded. The qipao, also known as cheongsam, was eventually created in the middle of 1920s.

In 1927, changshan and magua was established as the formal, official wear for men, and they were worn for important ceremonies, such as weddings, temple and ancestral halls worship. Women's formal wear was either a black ao and blue skirt with the same style as the earlier outfit or the cheongsam.

In the mid-1930s as men started to adopt more Western clothing. Under the Japanese occupation, more men started to wear even more Western suits and ties, and the men traditional clothing was worn on informal occasions. In 1932, the Nationalist government began to force Miao, Yao, and Kam people to wear hanfu.

During the Cultural Revolution, traditional Chinese clothing, as a broad term, was considered as being part of one of the "four olds" and the Mao suit was popularized for both genders. Skirts also disappeared as they were considered being both impractical for manual work and ideologically inappropriate during this time period. In 1974, Jiang Qing, the fourth wife of Mao Zedong, wanted to make an attire, known as the Jiang Qing dress, as the national dress for the Chinese women. The Jiang Qing dress, which she personally designed, consisted of pleated skirts instead of trousers, the sleeves were nearly elbow-length, there was a central opening, and the neckline was V-shaped and was delineated by a wide, white band; the skirt was based on the pleated skirts (i.e. the "one hundred pleats" skirt) worn by the court ladies worn in Tang dynasty paintings. The earliest form of Jiang Qing dress is documented and appear in the 1974 Asian Games photos. Jiang Qing tried to popularize the dress in diverse ways through public and foreign avenues; however, her dress failed to win popularity and was disliked. Since the late 1970s, skirts and dresses reappeared and western-style clothing became popular in daily lives.

=== Hanfu in popular media and opera (20th century – present) ===
Since the 20th century, hanfu and hanfu-style clothing has been used frequently as ancient costumes in Chinese and foreign television series, films and other forms of entertainment media, and was widely popularized since the late 1980s dramas. One example of historically inaccurate hanfu-style costume is the costume worn by Disney's Mulan, where the wide sleeves of the hanfu were reduced to narrow sleeves reflecting modern fashion and to reflect the character of Disney's Mulan.

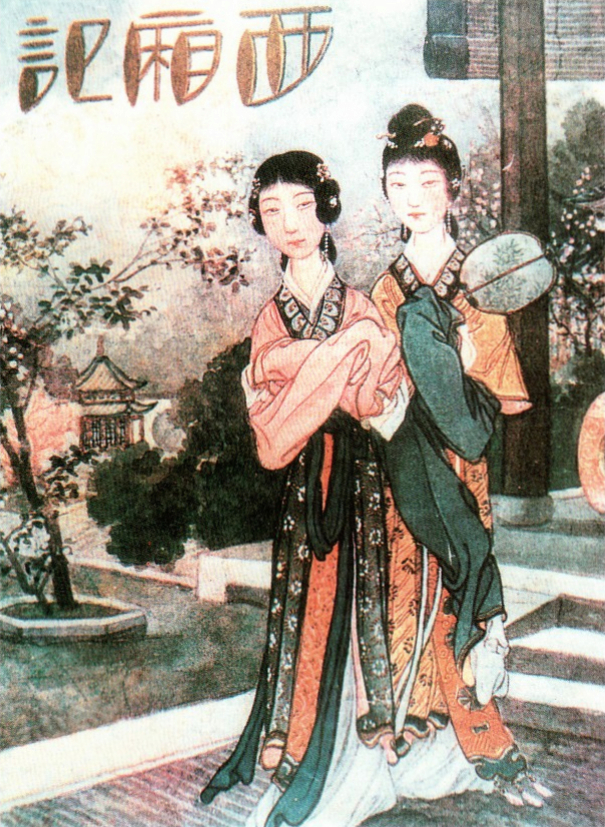
A movie poster of Romance of the Western Chamber, a 1927 silent movie.

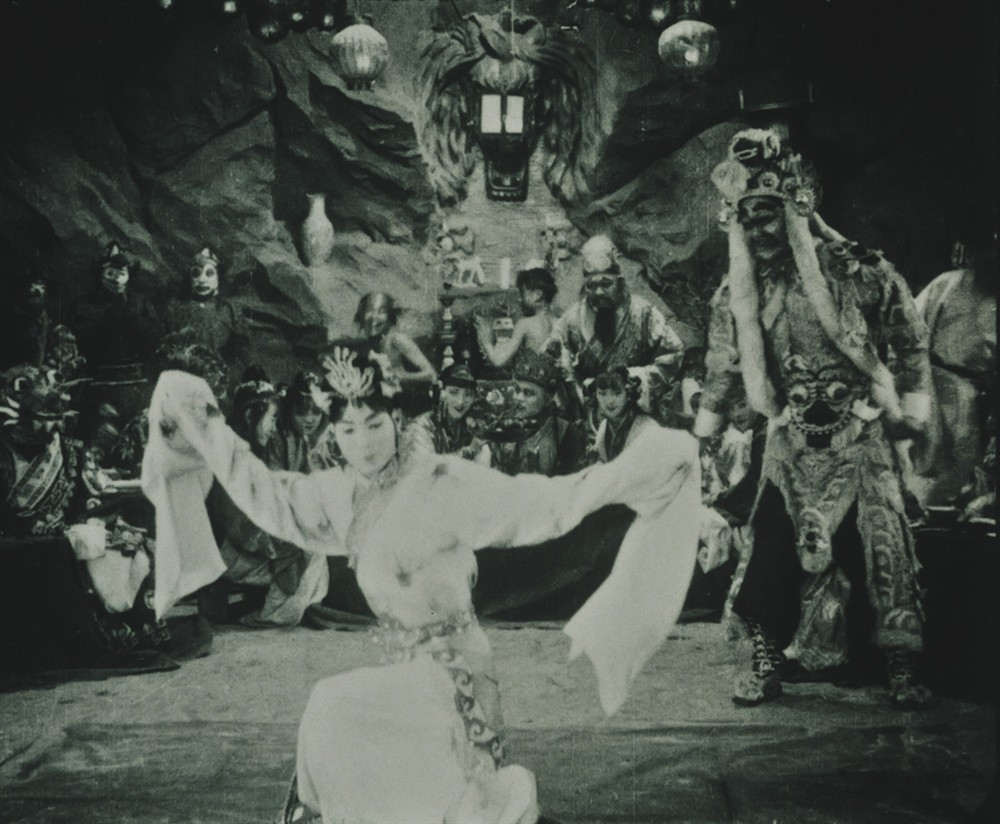
A scene from the silent film, The Cave of the Silken Web (1927). Various forms of hanfu-style costumes are depicted in the movie.

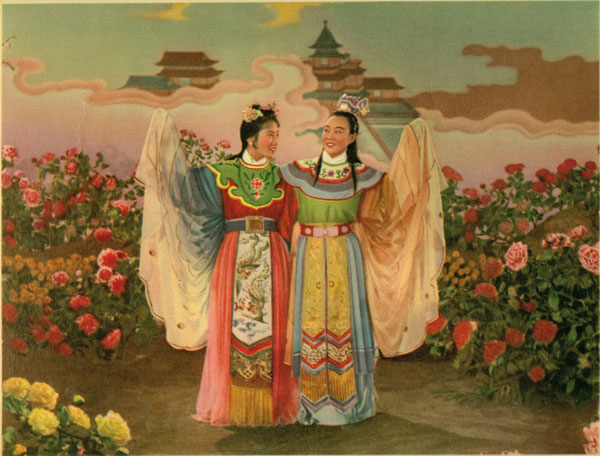
1954 film adaptation of the legend of the Butterfly Lovers.

Many elements and costumes styles worn in Chinese opera are derived from the Ming dynasty clothing and may be blended with the clothing style from the Tang to Qing dynasty. The opera costumes worn in Kunqu opera is primarily based on the clothing worn in Ming dynasty. And, most of the style of costumes depicted in Cantonese opera are also derived from the clothing of the Ming dynasty, with a few exception being derived from the Qing dynasty clothing. Costumes of Cantonese opera uses the Ming-style clothing for opera which are set in all dynasties, except for the ones set in the Qing dynasty; those costumes follow the Qing-style.

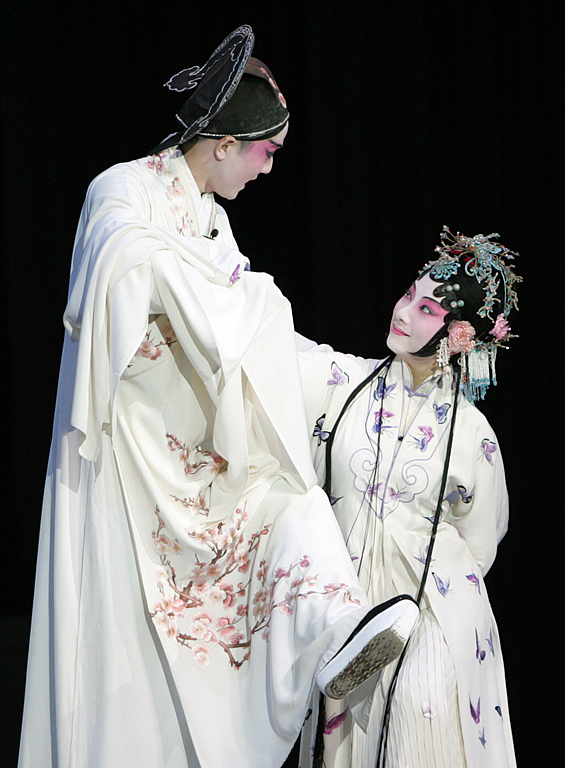
Hanfu in a Kunqu performance.

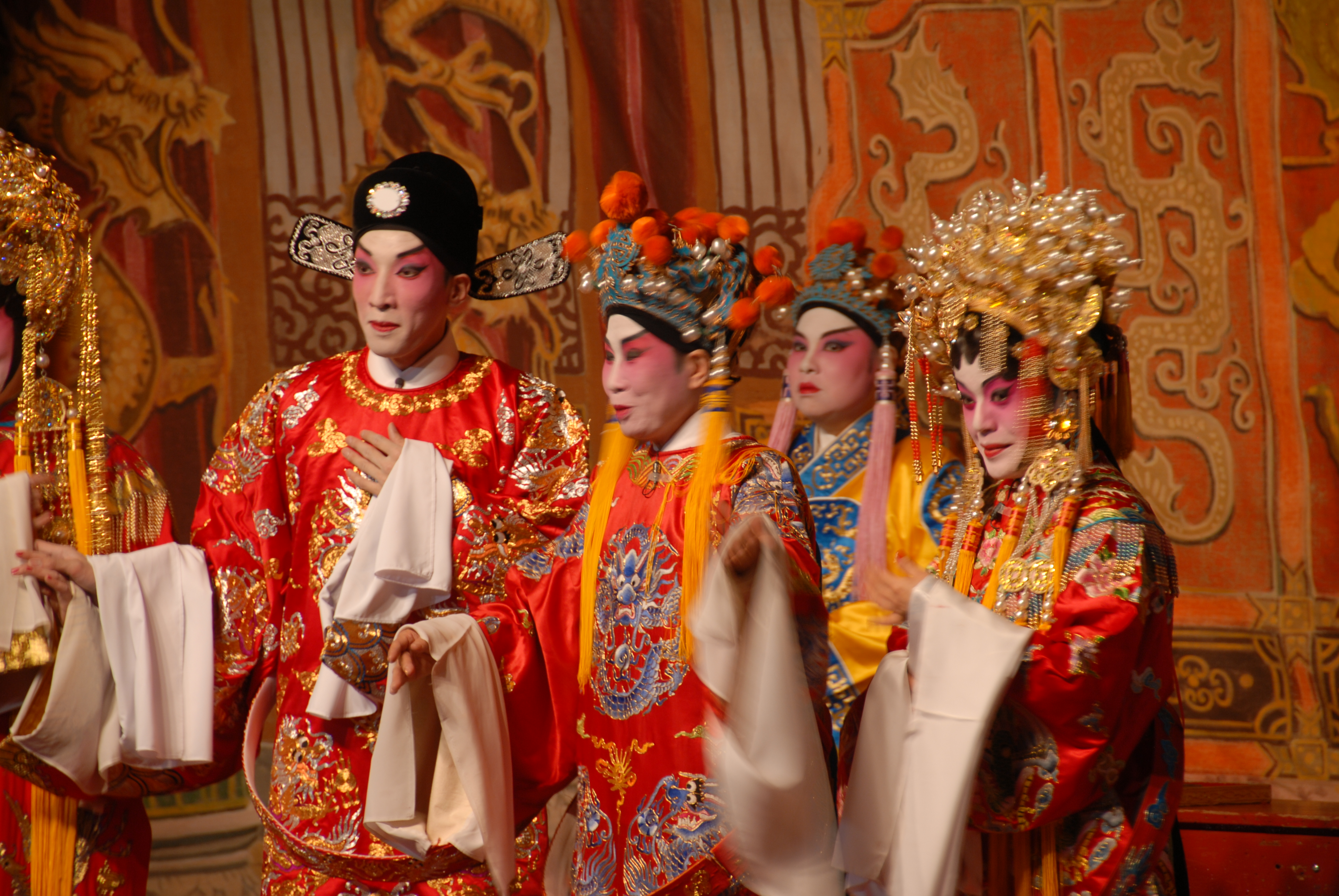
Cantonese Opera Happy Valley (2008).

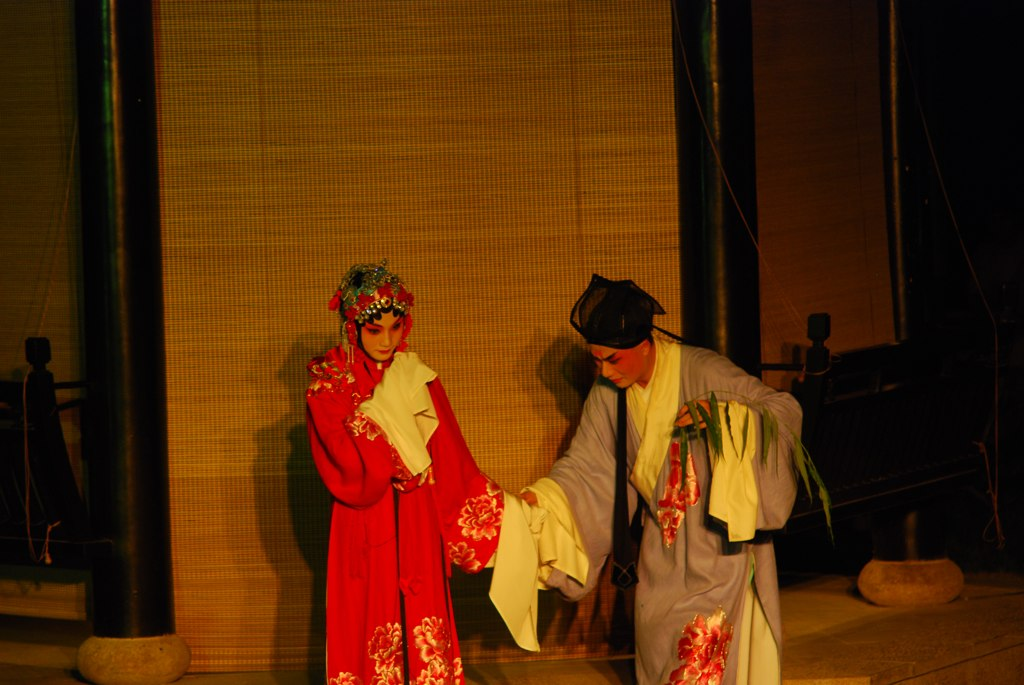
Kunqu opera of the Ming-dynasty play The Peony Pavilion.

=== Hanfu in modern Taoism (20th century – present) ===
Modern Taoist monks and Taoism practitioners continue to style their long hair into a touji (頭髻; a topknot hairstyle) and wear traditional clothing. Some modern taoist abbess and priests also wear cross-collared jiaoling youren robes and hats.

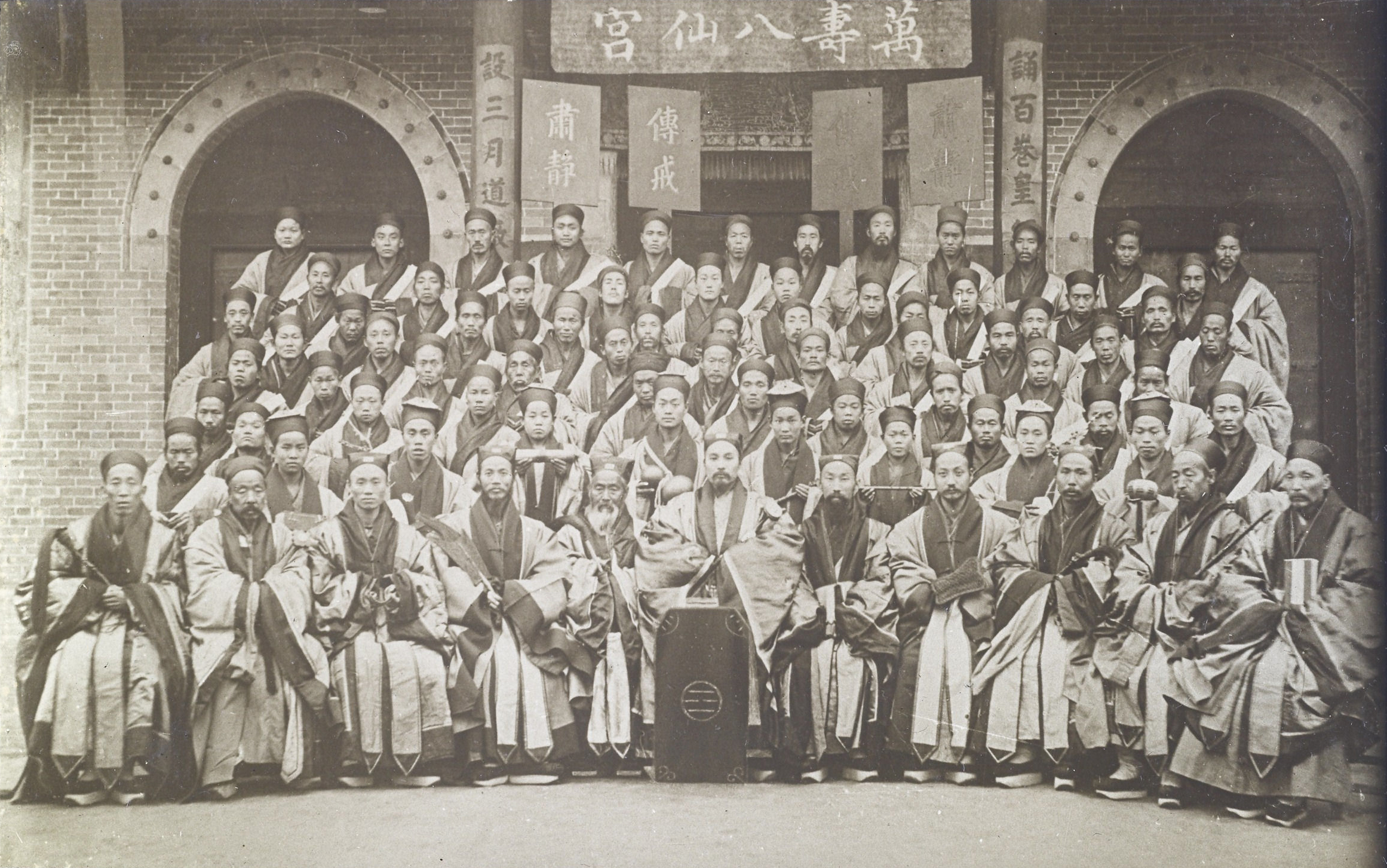
Taoist clergy of Baxian Temple, Xi'an, wearing daopao and hechang, 1910–1911.

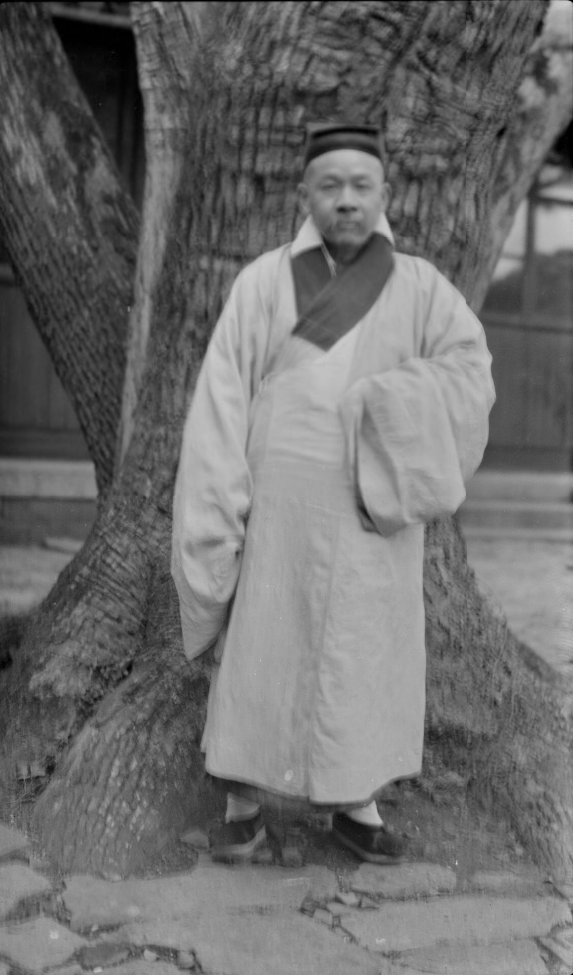
Taoist priest at a monastery, 1923.

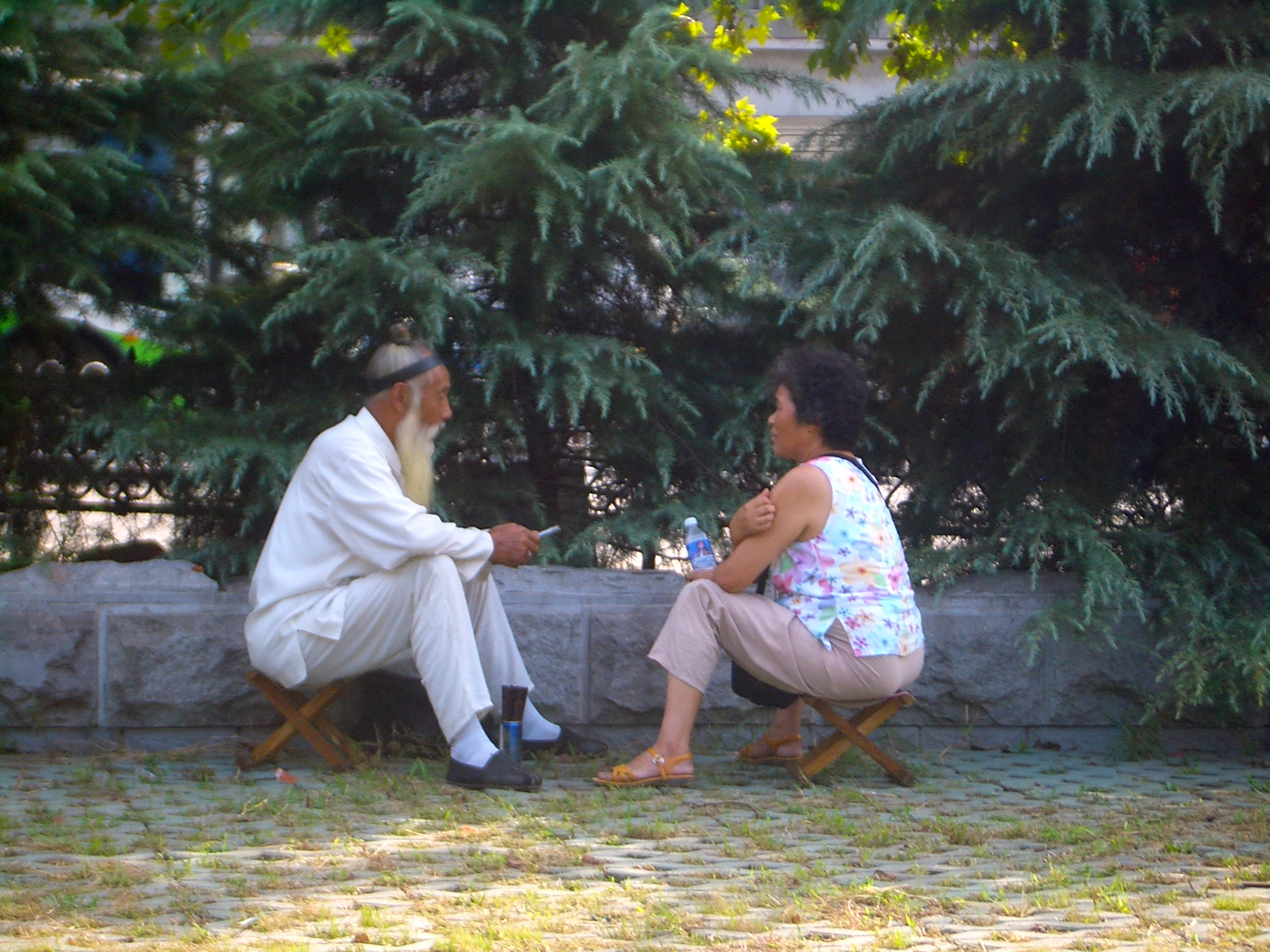
A Taoist soothsayer advising a woman; he has a topknot hairstyle, a surviving male hairstyle of Han people. Photo taken in 2008 outside the Changchun Temple (長春觀) in Wuhan, China.

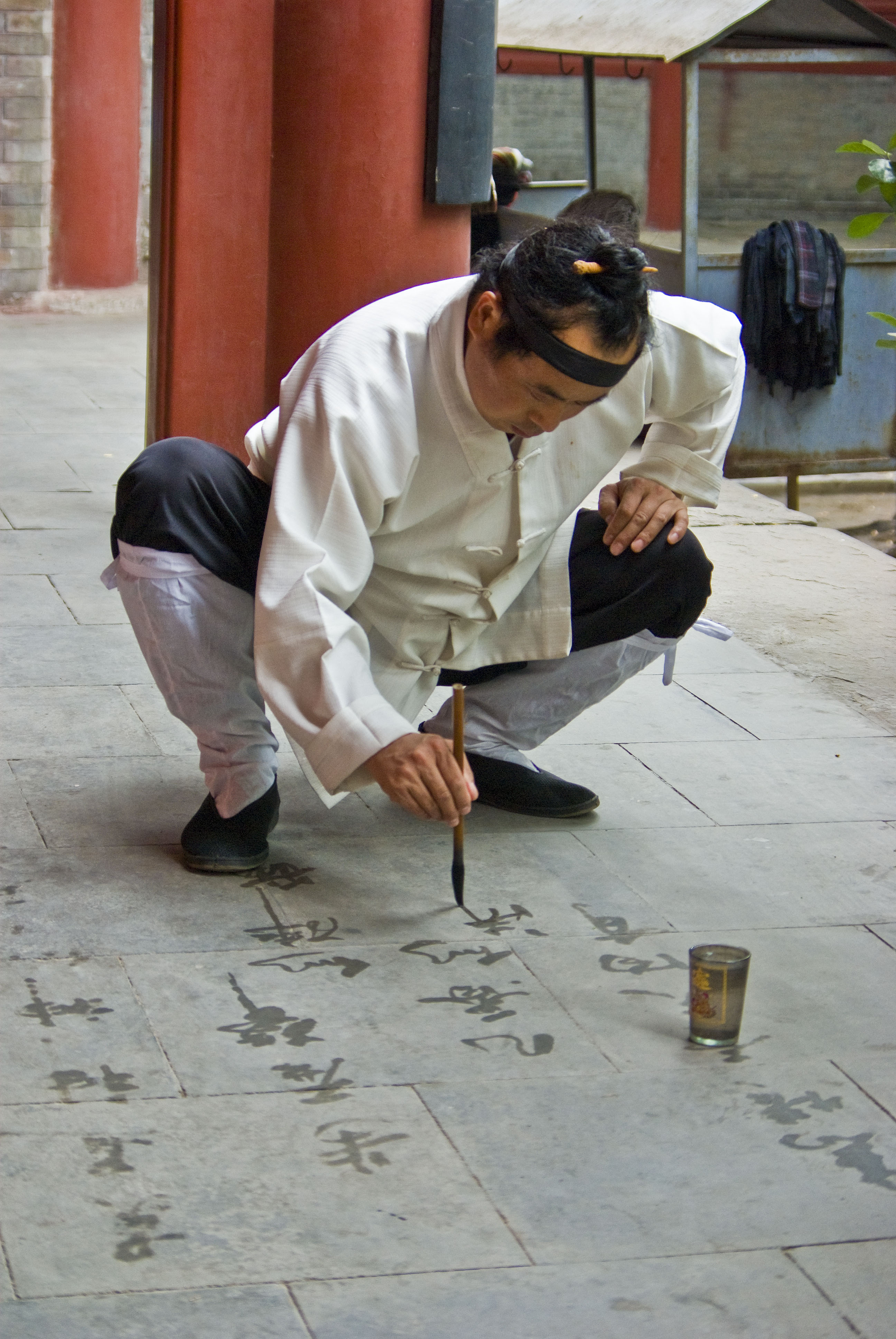
A Taoist monk; he has a topknot hairstyle and wears a tangzhuang-style upper garment. The upper garment is not considered as being hanfu; Beijing, date unknown.

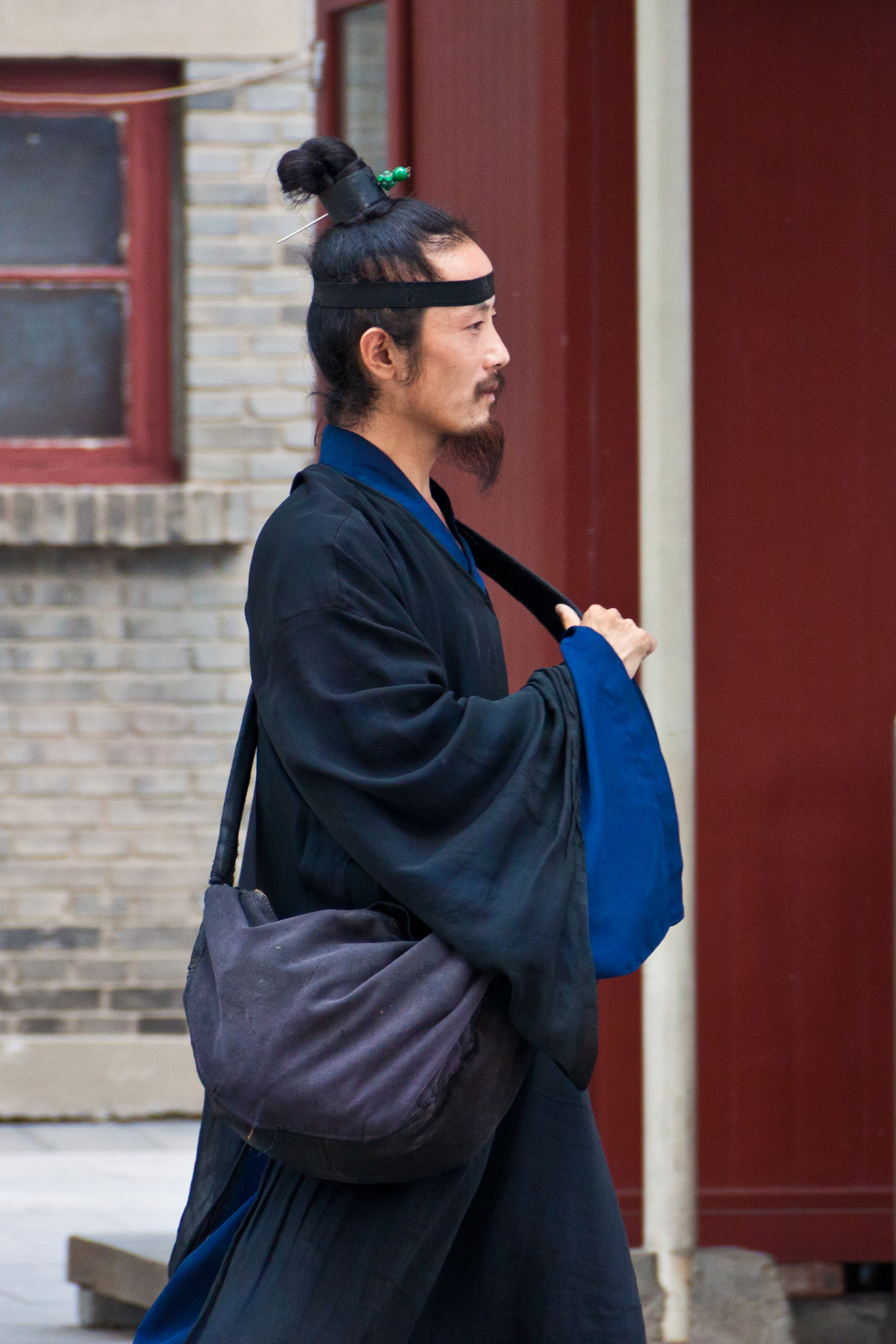
A Taoist man with a topknot and cross-collared jiaoling youren robe.

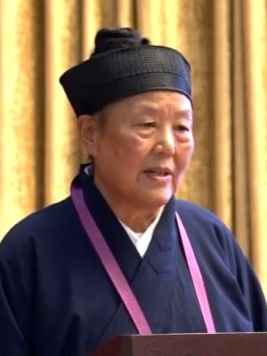
Wu Chengzhen, the first female fangzhang, or Taoist principal abbess, wearing cross-collared jiaoling youren clothing, 2023.

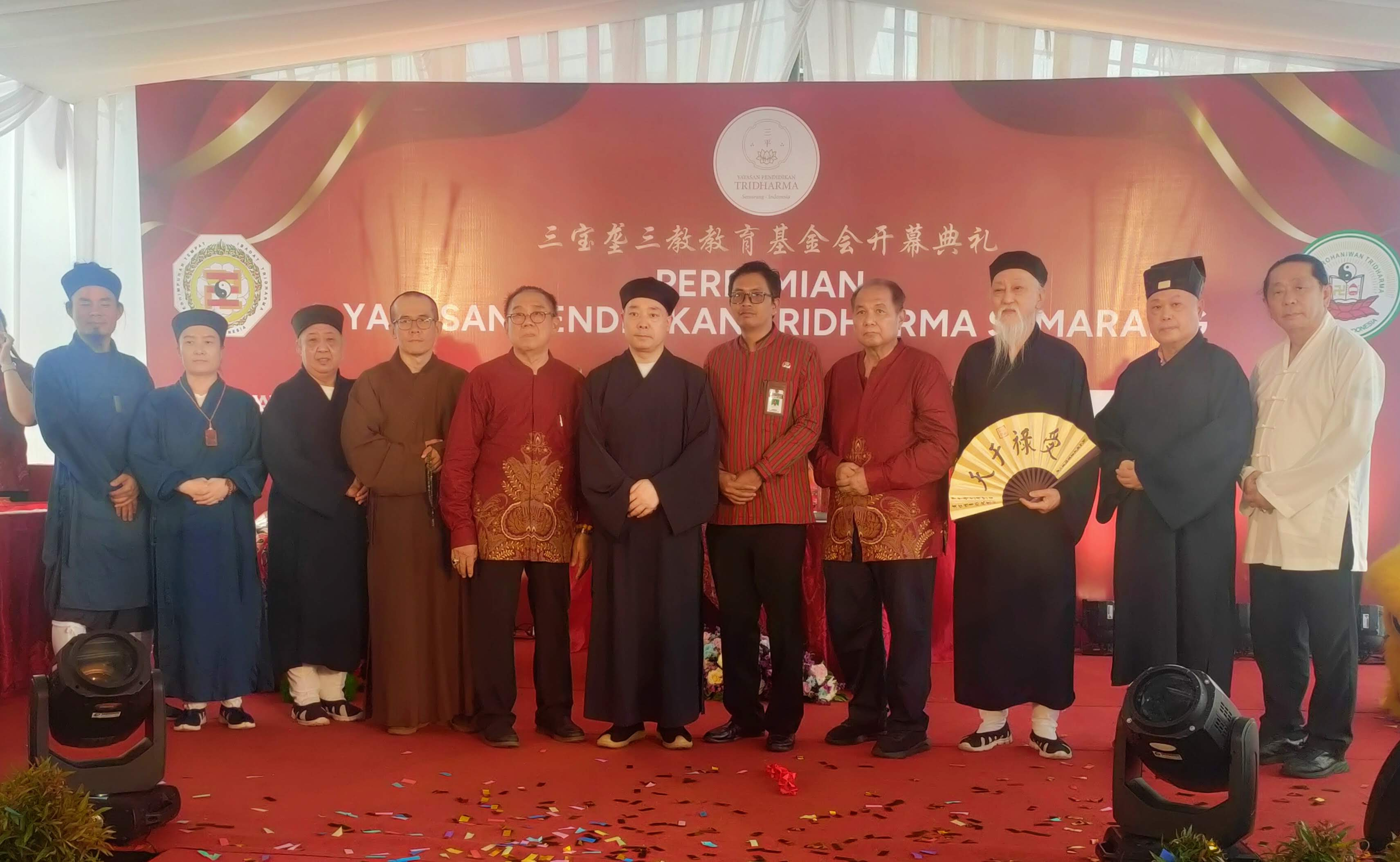
China Taoist Association Representatives at San Ping Academy, Central Java, Indonesia, 2024.

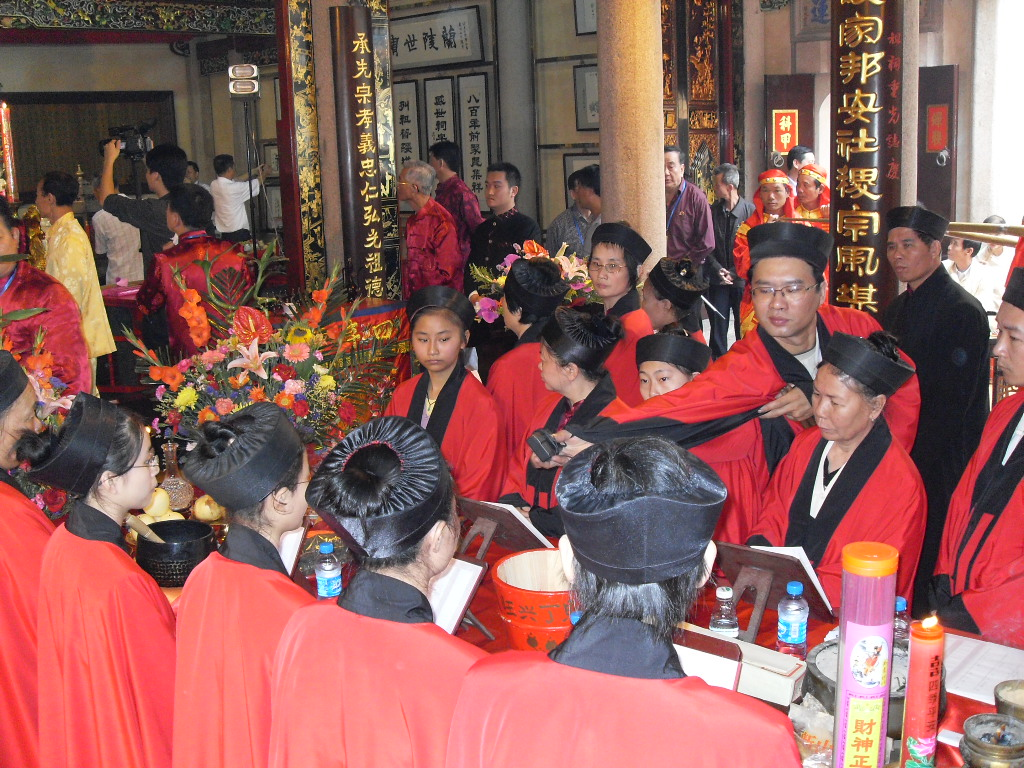
Taoist ceremony at Xiao ancestral temple in Chaoyang, Shantou, Guangdong, April 2010.

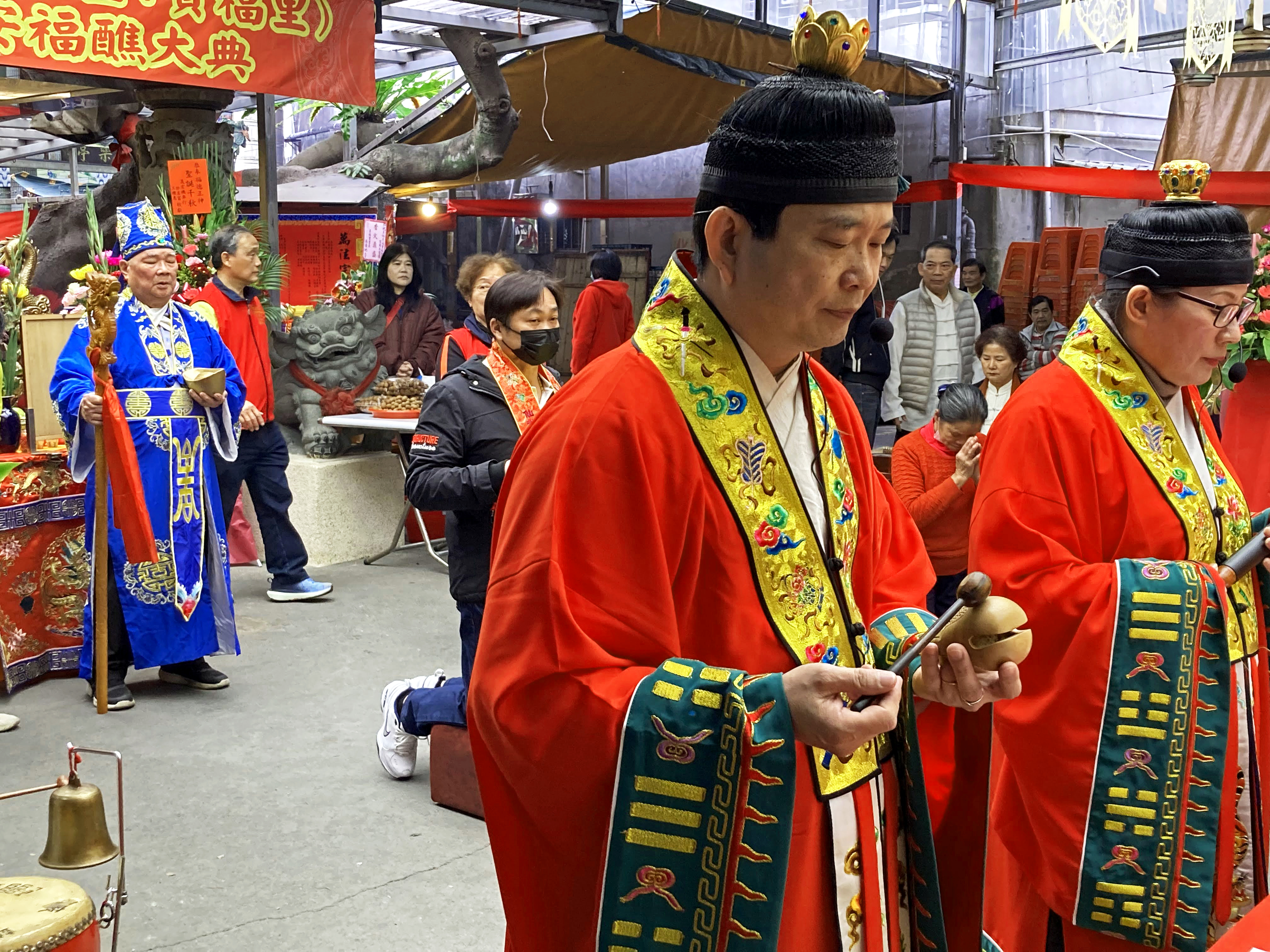
Taoist priests of Taiwan wearing ceremonial garments consisting of fayi and cross-collared inner robes, Tucheng District, New Taipei City.

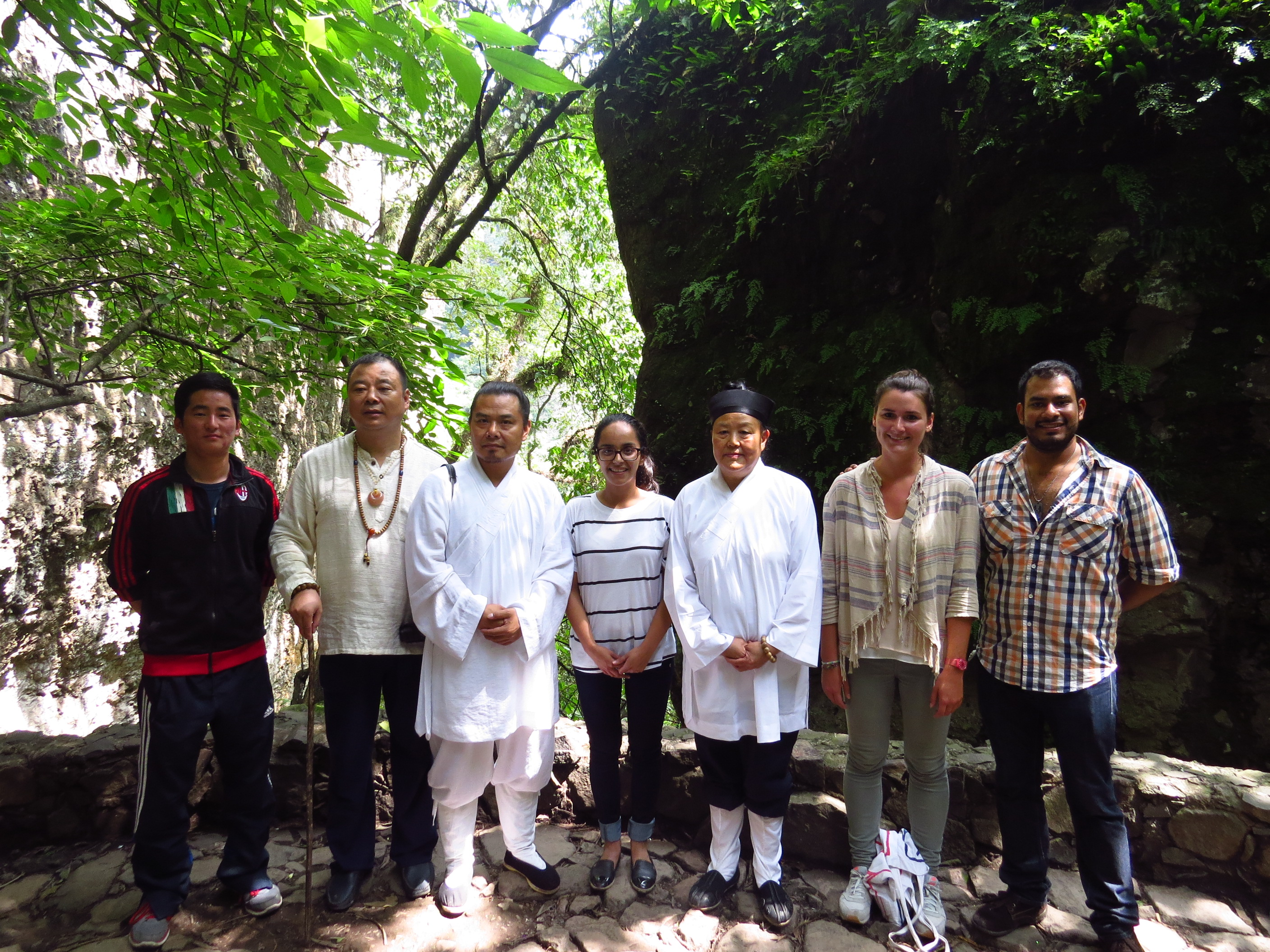
Taoists at Tepozteco Mountain with students from the Monterrey Institute of Technology, at Morelos, Mexico, 2015.

== 21st century ==
=== Hanfu Movement ===
The Hanfu Movement is an ongoing social movement which aims at popularizing hanfu and integrating historical Chinese elements into the design of modern clothing, as a way to promote a Chinese identity.

On 22 November 2003, a man named Wang Letian wore a DIY shenyi in public; his hanfu story was published in Lianhe Zaobao newspaper and attracted the public attention. This is commonly perceived as the beginning of the modern Hanfu Movement.

=== Growing popularity and market trend ===
Entering the 21st century, Hanfu has become a fashion trend and lucrative business sector. In 2018, it was estimated that the Hanfu market consisted of 2 million potential consumers. The estimated revenue sales for 2019 was 1.4 billion yuan (US$199.3 million). According to the iiMedia 2018 survey, women make up 88.2% of the Hanfu enthusiasts and 75.8% of the Hanfu stores on Taobao and Tmall platforms only sell Hanfu for women.

In 2019, it was estimated that there were 1,188 online Hanfu stores on Tmall and Taobao, which shows an increase of 45.77% over the previous year. The Hanfu stores Chong Hui Han Tang ranked third on Tmall in 2019 after the Hanfu store Hanshang Hualian and Shisanyu. In the 2019 edition of the Xitang Hanfu Culture Week, it was estimated that it attracted 40,000 Hanfu enthusiast participants.

A study done by Forward Industry Research Institute (a Chinese research institute) shows that by 2020, the number of Hanfu enthusiasts in China has reached 5.163 million, creating a market size equivalent to 6.36 billion yuan (US$980 million), a proportional increase of over 40% compared to the previous year. Meanwhile, it is projected that by the end of 2021, the total number of Hanfu enthusiasts across China will exceed 7 million, and that the market size of Hanfu will exceed 9 billion yuan (US$1.39 billion).

=== Modern Hanfu ===
The 21st century Hanfu is still referred as Hanfu within the Hanfu cultural community for ease of expression. On 8 March 2021, the magazine Vogue published an article on modern Hanfu defining it as a "type of dress from any era when Han Chinese ruled" and reported that the styles based on the Tang, Song, Ming periods were the most popular.

According to some contemporary scholars, modern day Hanfu can be classified into three categories:

1. Reproductions that are made strictly following the styles depicted on ancient paintings, murals, and/or archaeological finds.
2. "Contemporary Hanfu" (also known as modern Hanfu, new Hanfu, restored Hanfu and improved Hanfu) which refers to those that are developed based on historical styles of Hanfu, and largely retain the ancient styles (can still be classified into existing categories of historical Hanfu, such as ruqun, beizi etc.), but with modern aesthetics and technologies introduced into their designs.
3. "Hanyuansu" (漢元素), or "Clothes with Hanfu Elements", refers to modern/everyday clothing with Hanfu style features and/or elements in their design, but cannot be classified into existing categories of ancient Hanfu.

==== Characteristics and Design ====
Most modern hanfu are based on sculptures, paintings, art objects, historical records, and historical clothing. Ming dynasty Han Chinese robes given by the Ming Emperors to the Chinese noble Dukes Yansheng descended from Confucius are still preserved in the Confucius Mansion after over five centuries. Robes from the Qing emperors are also preserved there. The Jurchens in the Jin dynasty and Mongols in the Yuan dynasty continued to patronize and support the Confucian Duke Yansheng. Around the year 2007 or 2008, a group of young people from Minghang district, Shanghai, started a project to restore Chinese clothing from ancient dynasties based on rigorous research, spending their days reading ancient documents and looking at paintings to find detailed information about the styles, materials, colours and patterns used in ancient times; this group is called the Ancient Chinese Clothing Restoration Team;.

It is also worth noting that an important feature of the modern hanfu (regardless of the three categories it belongs to) is its jiaoling youren characteristic. In fact, this design bear special cultural moral and ethical values. It is said the left collar covering the right represents the perfection of human culture on human nature and the overcoming of bodily forces by the spiritual power of ethical ritual teaching; the expansive cutting and board sleeve represents a moral, concordant relation between nature and human creative power; the use of the girdle to fasten the garment over the body represents the constraints of Han culture to limit human's desire that would incur amoral deed. As a result, jiaoling youren has become an inseparable part of modern hanfu design.

The modern hanfu also changes to a style that can be worn daily, and these styles combined with western clothing or even clothing from other cultures. For example, the recent emergence of Christmas-theme hanfu trend (which occurred especially for Christmas season) on social media and online shops combines hanfu with Christmas elements and Christmas colour hues. Another trend is the incorporation of (western-style) lace elements to the hanfu; however, those designs are not considered as authentic hanfu but are considered being clothing with Han elements (or hanyuansu).

Modern hanfu

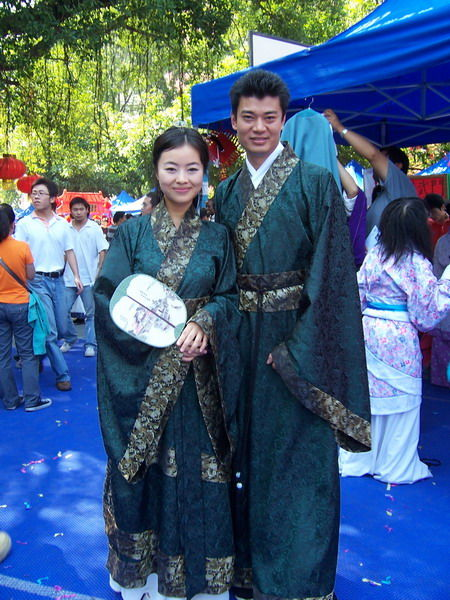
A woman wearing qujupao and a man wearing a zhiqupao, Chinese Cultural Festival in Guangzhou, 2008.

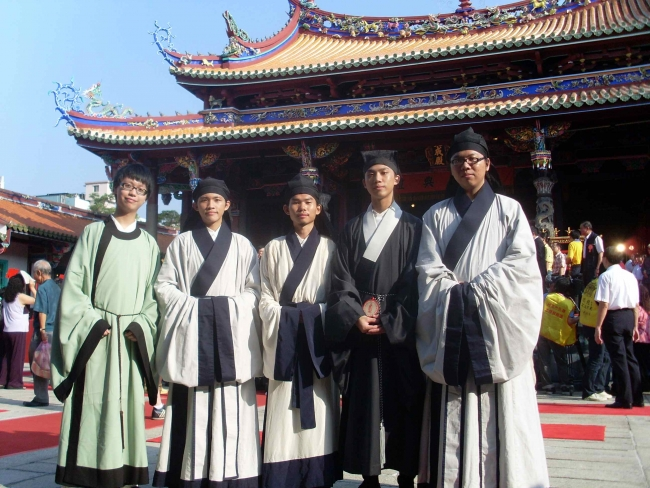
Men wearing shenyi, Panling Lanshan, and zhiduo, date unknown.

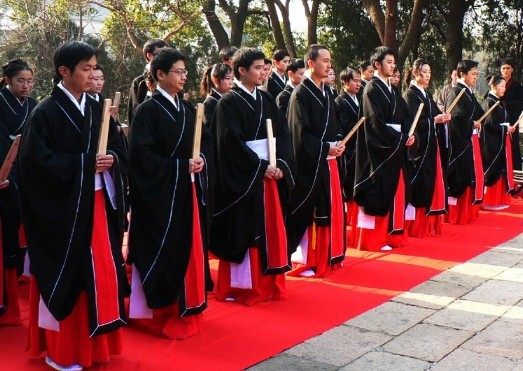
Men and women in xuanduan, possibly during a Guan Li ceremony, 2007.

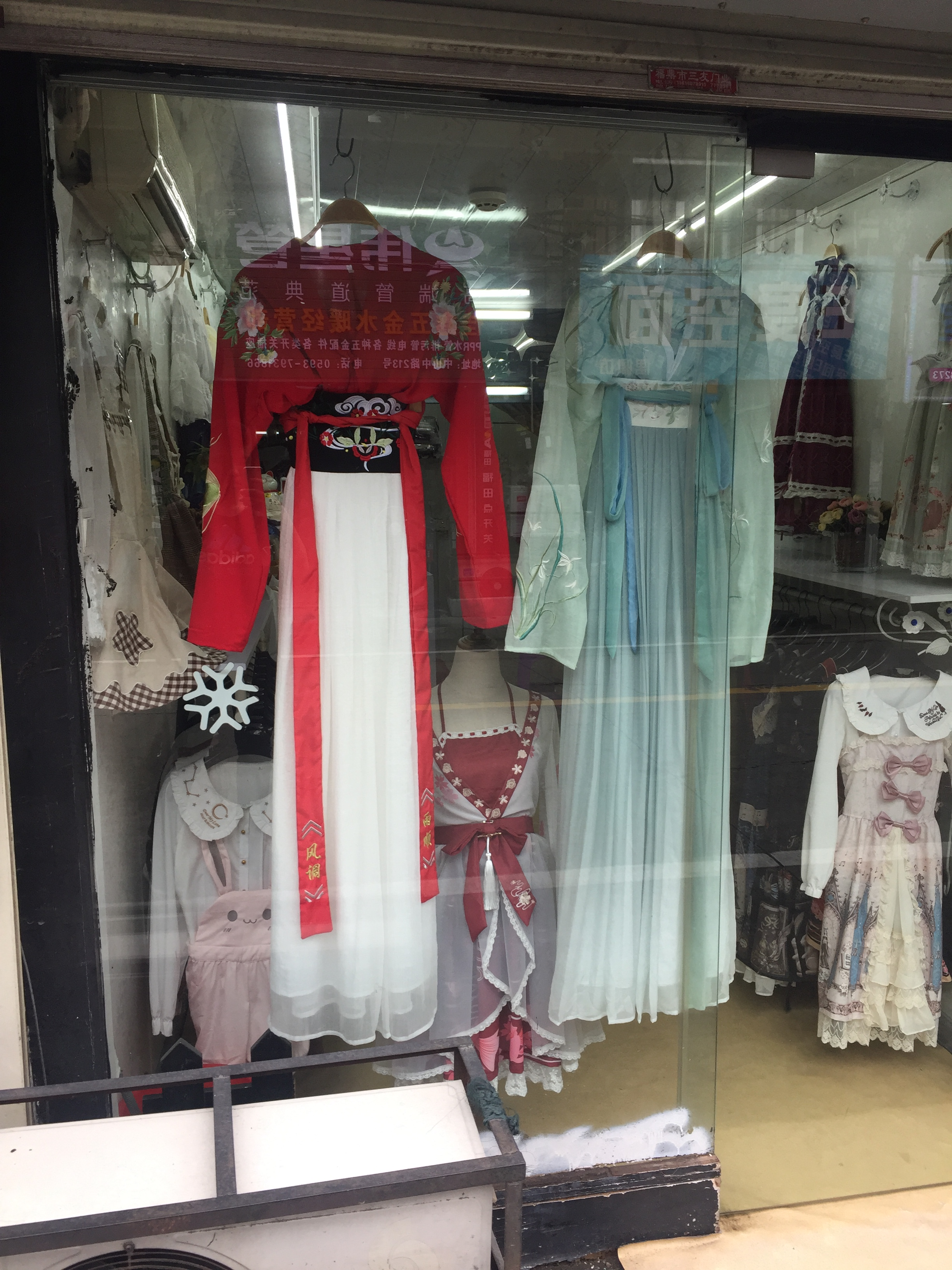
Two ruqun in a clothing store; on the left is a hanfu with a red ru and a white skirt; on the right, the hanfu is composed of a green ru and a green skirt; 2018.

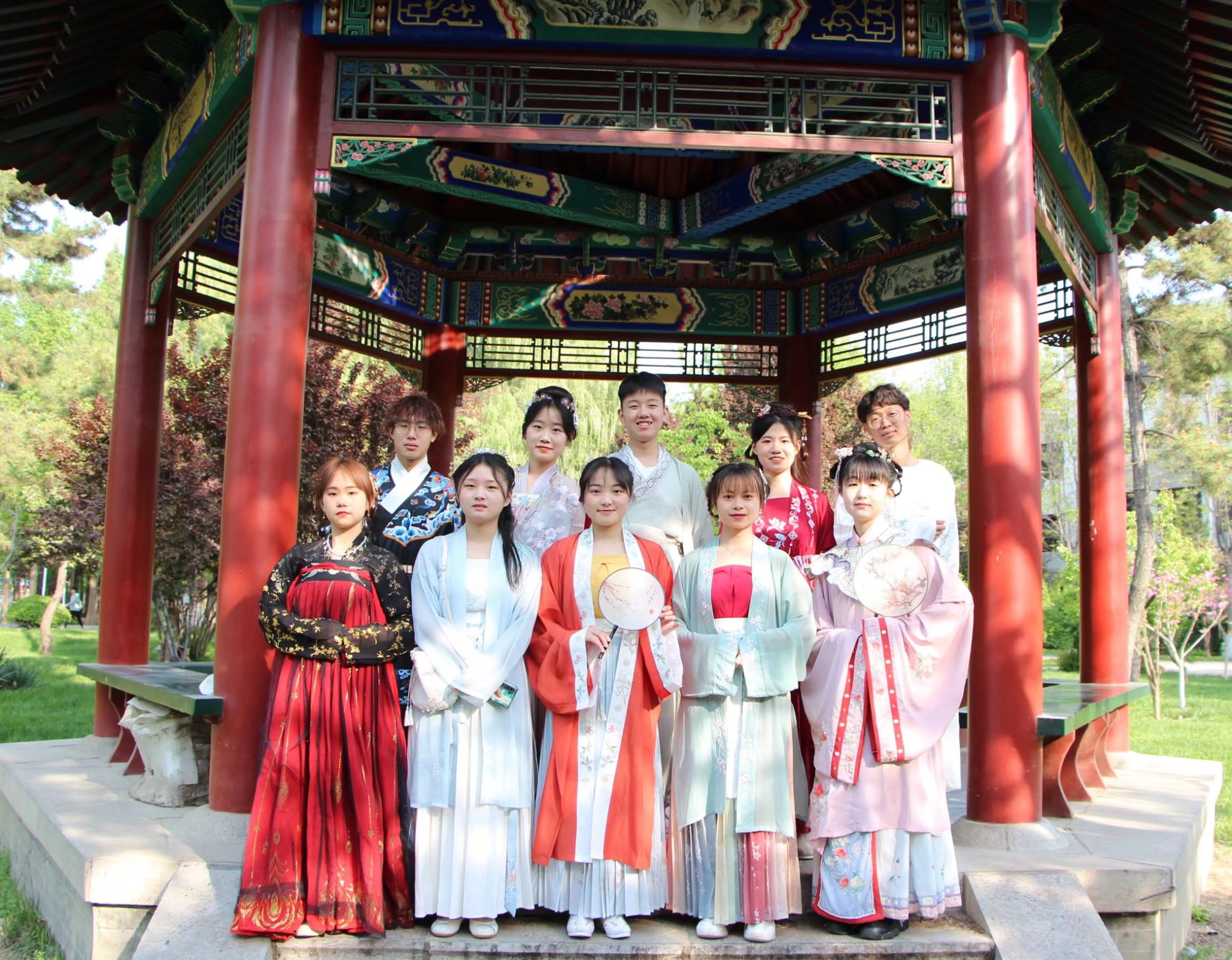
Some students wearing diverse forms of Hanfu during a spring outing.

== Garments ==
The style of historical Han clothing can be summarized as containing garment elements that are arranged in distinctive and sometimes specific ways. A complete set of garment is assembled from several pieces of clothing into an attire:

Component	Romanization	Hanzi	Definition
Upper Garment	Yi	衣	Open cross-collar shirt.
Upper Garment	Ru	襦	Open cross-collar shirt, only worn by women.
Lower Garment	Ku	裤	Trousers or pants.
Lower Garment	Chang	裳	Skirt for men.
Lower Garment	Qun	裙	Skirt for women.
Full-body Cloth	Pao	袍	Closed full-body garment.
Full-body Cloth	Chang ru	长襦	Long skirt, only worn by women.
Outer Garment	Ao	袄	Multi-layer open cross-collar shirt or jacket.
Outer Garment	Shan	衫	Single-layer open cross-collar shirt or jacket.
Outer Garment	Banbi	半臂	A half-sleeved waistcoat.
Outer Garment	Bixi	蔽膝	A cloth attached from the waist, covering front of legs.
Outer Garment	Dou Peng	斗篷	Cape.
Outer Garment	Pifeng	披风	Cloak.
Outer Garment	Pibo	披帛	A long silk scarf, however not used to cover neck. Sometimes covering shoulders, other times just hanging from elbow.
Outer Garment	Zhao shan	罩衫	Cloaking coat. Usually open at the front.
Inner Garment	Dudou	肚兜	Belly Cover. Covers front upper body. Worn by women and children.
Inner Garment	Moxiong	抹胸	Tube top. Worn by women.
Inner Garment	Zhongyi	中衣	Inner garments, mostly white cotton or silk. Also called zhongdan (中单).

There is differences between traditional garment of Han ethnic and other ethnic groups in China, most notably the Manchu-influenced clothes, qipao. A general comparison of the two styles can be seen as the following provides:

Component	Han	Manchu
Collars	Crossing diagonally. Loose lapels, front opened.	Parallel vertical overlapping collars, with paralleled secured lapels, no front openings.
Sleeves	Long and loose	Narrow and tight
Buttons	Sparingly used and concealed inside the garment	Numerous and prominently displayed
Fittings	Belts and sashes are used to close, secure, and fit the garments around the waist	Flat ornate buttoning systems are typically used to secure the collar and fit the garment around the neck and upper torso

== Footwear ==
There were many rules of etiquette which controlled people's daily lives, and this included the use and etiquette of shoe and sock wearing. The rules of Zhou stipulated that shoes had to be removed before entering a house; shoes and socks had to be removed at banquets, and ministers who had to meet with the emperor had to remove both their shoes and socks. Being barefoot was considered a taboo on ceremonial worship occasions.

== Headwear and hairstyles ==
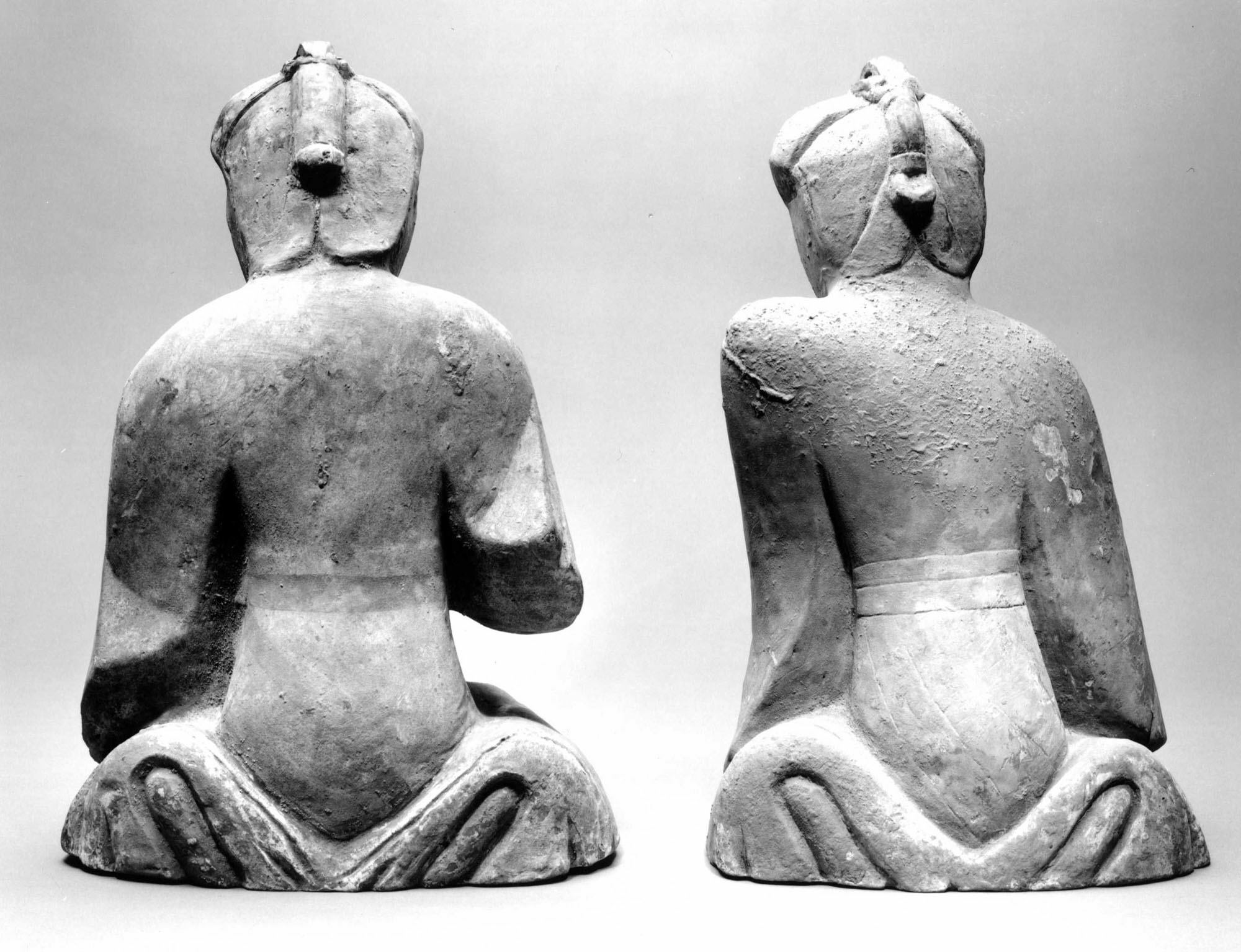
Han dynasty pottery figure showing topknot were partially braided behind the back of the head.

On top of the garments, hats (for men) or hairpieces (for women) may be worn. One can often tell the profession or social rank of someone by what they wear on their heads. The typical types of male headwear are called jin (巾) for soft caps, mao (帽) for stiff hats and guan for formal headdress. Officials and academics have a separate set of hats, typically the putou, the wushamao, the si-fang pingding jin (四方平定巾; or simply, fangjin: 方巾) and the Zhuangzi jin (莊子巾). A typical hairpiece for women is the hairpin called ji (笄) that appeared since Neolithic time, and there are more elaborate hairpieces.

In addition, managing hair was also a crucial part of ancient Han people's daily life. Commonly, males and females would stop cutting their hair once they reached adulthood. This was marked by the Chinese coming of age ceremony Guan Li, usually performed between ages 15 to 20. They allowed their hair to grow long naturally, including facial hair. This was due to Confucius' teaching "Shenti fa fu, shou zhu fumu, bu gan huishang, xiaozhi shi ye (身體髮膚，受諸父母，不敢毀傷，孝之始也)" – which can be roughly translated as 'My body, hair and skin are bestowed by my father and mother, I dare not damage any of them, as this is the least I can do to honor and respect my parents'. In fact, cutting one's hair off in ancient China was considered a legal punishment called 'Kun (髡)', designed to humiliate criminals, as well as applying a character as a facial tattoo to notify one's criminality, the punishment is referred to as 'Qing (黥)', since regular people wouldn't have tattoos on their skin attributed to the same philosophy.

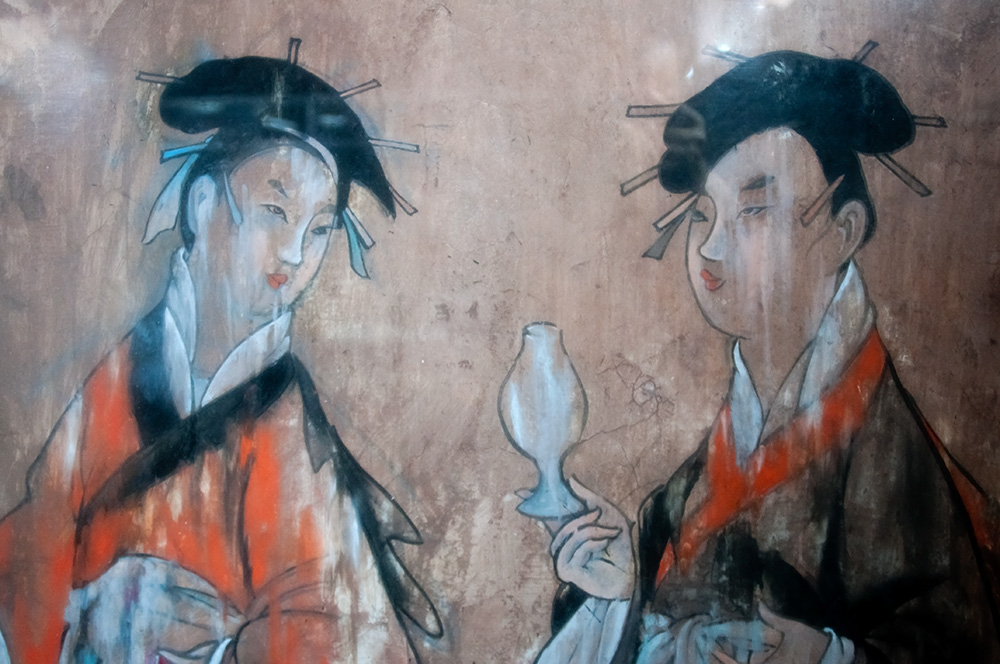
Mural of two women with Han hairstyles, Dahuting Tomb

Children were exempt from the above commandment; they could cut their hair short, make different kinds of knots or braids, or simply just let them hang without any care, especially because such a decision was usually made by the parents rather than the children themselves; therefore, parental respect was not violated. However, once they entered adulthood, every male was obliged to tie his long hair into a bun called ji (髻) either on or behind his head and always cover the bun up with different kinds of headdresses (except Buddhist monks, who would always keep their heads completely shaved to show that they're "cut off from the earthly bonds of the mortal world"; and Taoist monks, who would usually just use hair sticks called zan to hold the buns in place without concealing them). Thus the 'disheveled hair', a common but erring depiction of ancient Chinese male figures seen in most modern Chinese period dramas or movies with hair (excluding facial hair) hanging down from both sides and/or in the back are historically inaccurate. Females on the other hand, had more choices in terms of decorating their hair as adults. They could still arrange their hair into as various kinds of hairstyles as they pleased. There were different fashions for women in various dynastic periods.

Such strict "no-cutting" hair tradition was implemented all throughout Han Chinese history since Confucius' time up until the end of Ming dynasty (1644 CE), when the Qing Prince Dorgon forced the male Han people to adopt the hairstyle of Manchu men, which was shave their foreheads bald and gather the rest of the hair into the queue to show that they submitted to Qing authority, the so-called "Queue Order" (薙髮令). Han children and females were spared from this order, also Taoist monks were allowed to keep their hair and Buddhist monks were allowed to keep all their hair shaven. Han defectors to the Qing like Li Chengdong and Liu Liangzuo and their Han troops carried out the queue order to force it on the general population. Han Chinese soldiers in 1645 under Han General Hong Chengchou forced the queue on the people of Jiangnan while Han people were initially paid silver to wear the queue in Fuzhou when it was first implemented.

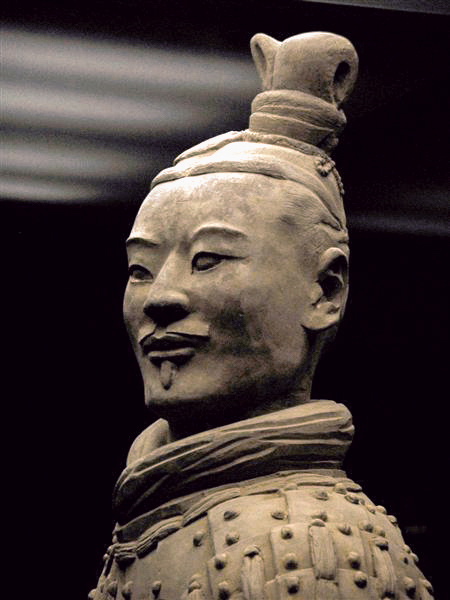

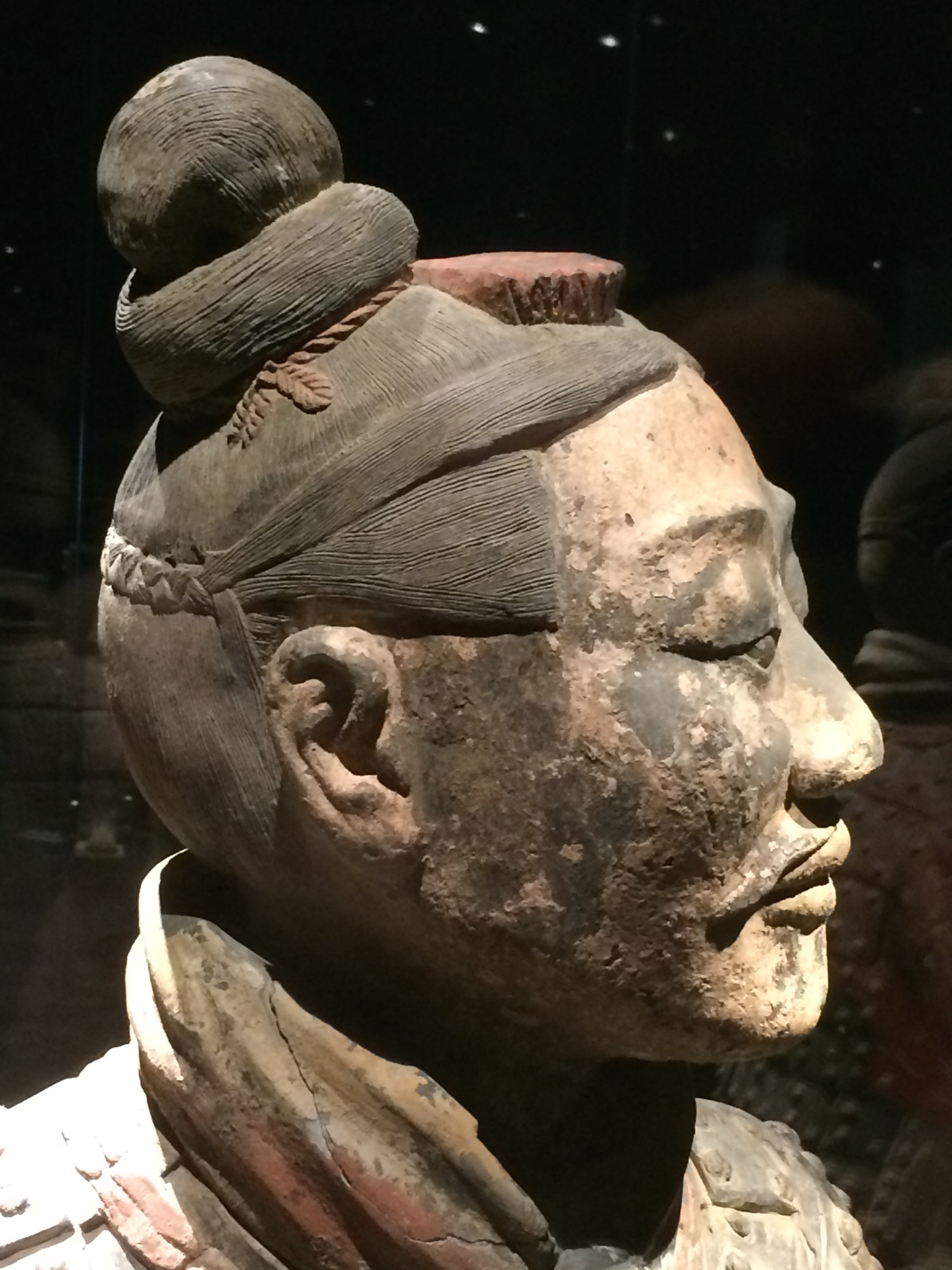

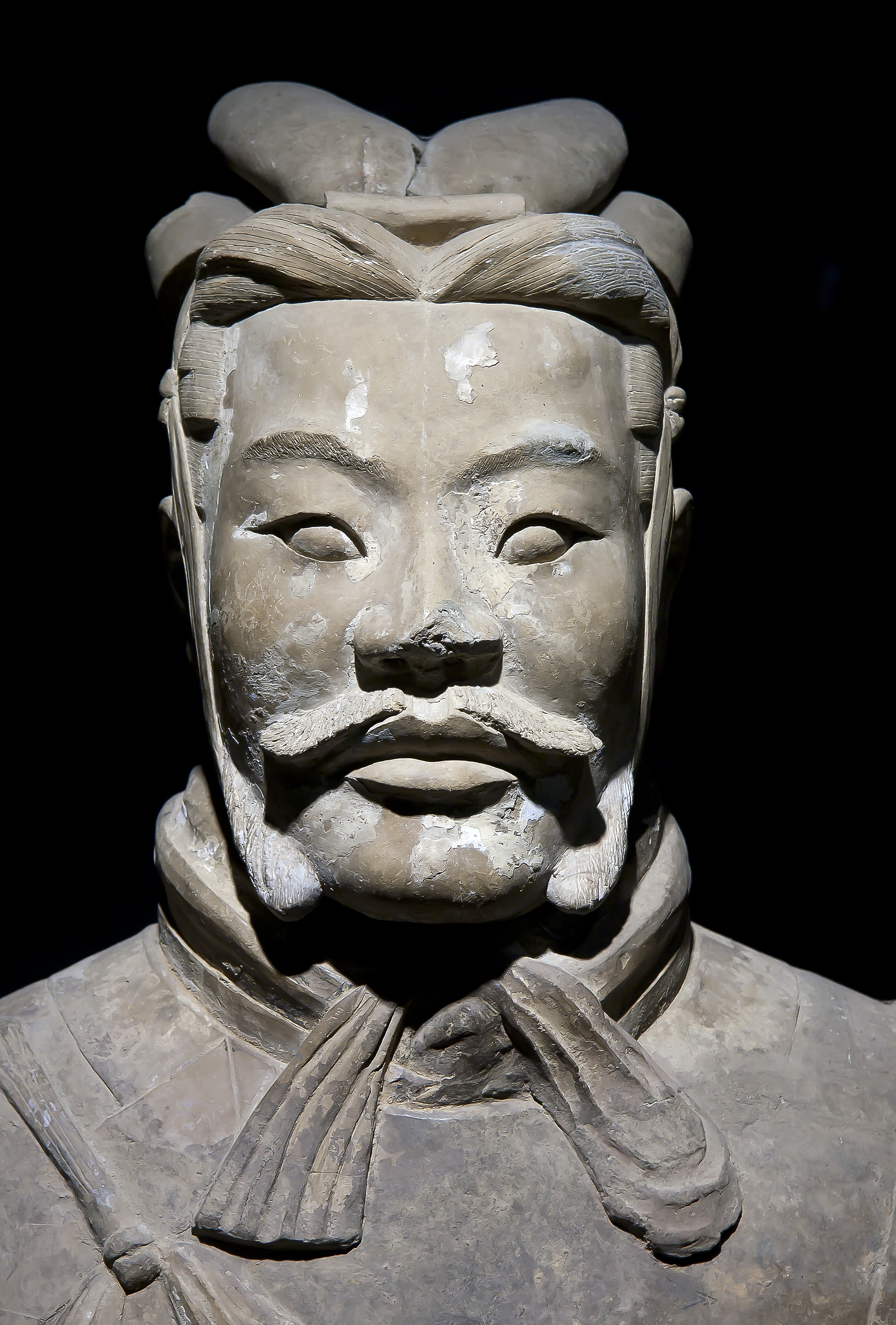

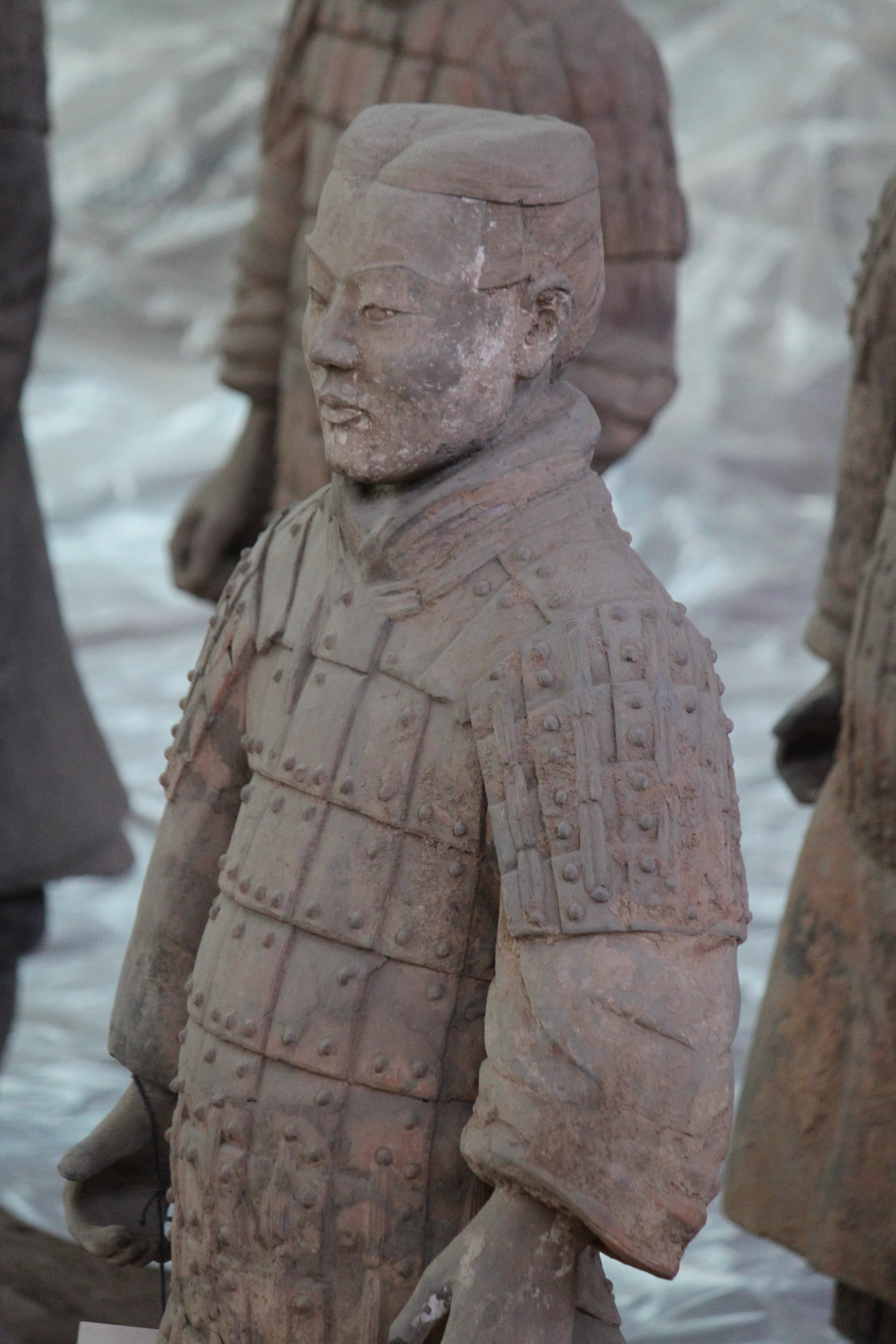
Ways of tying the topknot seen on Qin Terracotta soldiers. Hair was partially tied at the back of the head with braids, sometimes having no topknot at all.

== Accessories ==
Hanfu also consists of many forms of accessories, such as jewelry, waist ornaments, ribbons, shawls, scarves, and other hand-held items. rdized: the upper ring (珩, héng), middle ring (琚, jū), lower ring (璜, huáng), with jade beads (冲牙, chōngyá) strung between. Each piece corresponded to a cardinal virtue — benevolence, righteousness, propriety, wisdom, and fidelity. The quality of jade indicated social rank: imperial princes wore white jade from Khotan, officials wore green jade, and commoners were restricted to soapstone or glass imitations. Empress dowager Cixi was known to own over 3,000 jade pieces, including a set of twelve pendants each carved from a single flawless block.

=== Silk Sashes and Waist Ornaments (宫绦) ===
The waist sash was the defining structural element of Hanfu. Unlike modern belts, the Chinese sash (绦, tāo) was a wide silk band wrapped multiple times around the waist and tied in specific knots. The knot style indicated the wearer's region and social context: butterfly knots for festive occasions, double-loop knots for formal court attire, and simple hanging knots for everyday wear. During the Ming Dynasty, the xiaopei (霞帔) — a embroidered waist ornament worn over the shoulders — became mandatory court attire for wives of officials, the embroidery pattern strictly regulated by rank. Wives of first-rank officials wore gold-threaded phoenixes; ninth-rank officials' wives wore plain silk with no embroidery. The xiaopei was fastened with a silver clasp called the yinkou (银扣) and hung with jade pendants that clicked audibly when the wearer moved.

=== Pibo Shawls (披帛) ===
The pibo was a long silk scarf, typically two to three meters in length, draped over the shoulders and arms. It originated during the Han Dynasty as a practical garment for palace women to cover their shoulders, but reached its artistic peak in the Tang Dynasty, where dancers used the pibo as an extension of their movement. Tang dynasty poet Bai Juyi described a dancer "sending the flying ribbon to the clouds" in his poem Song of the Rainbow Skirt and Feathered Coat (霓裳羽衣歌). The pibo was worn across all social classes but distinguished by material: imperial consorts wore Sichuan brocade with gold-wrapped threads, while common women wore hemp or plain silk. In Buddhist cave murals at Dunhuang, celestial apsaras are consistently depicted with flowing pibos — indicating the accessory's association with otherworldly grace. The pibo declined during the Ming Dynasty as women adopted the xiapei and higher-collared garments, but has seen a major revival in the modern Hanfu movement.

=== Round Silk Fans (团扇) ===
The round silk fan (团扇, tuánshàn) — also called the palace fan (宫扇) — was the most socially complex Hanfu accessory. It served as a cooling implement, a communication device, and a status symbol simultaneously. In Chinese poetic tradition, the fan carried layered meanings: a woman's dropped fan signaled romantic interest; a deliberately closed fan indicated displeasure; fanning slowly was a mark of refinement. The tuánshàn reached its highest artistic form during the Song Dynasty, when court painters created fans that were genuine works of art — one side painted with birds and flowers, the other inscribed with calligraphy. These fans were mounted on handles of sandalwood, ivory, or bamboo and carried by both men and women. Folding fans (折扇, zhéshàn) were introduced from Japan via Korea during the Northern Song Dynasty and became the preferred accessory of Ming scholars, who used them to display their own calligraphy and painting. The folding fan's ribs were counted as status markers: 16 ribs for scholars, 20 for officials, 24 for imperial princes.

=== Hairpins and Coronets (发簪与凤冠) ===
Hair accessories in Hanfu formed a complete language of age, marital status, and social rank. Unmarried girls wore their hair in simple styles with fabric flowers (簪花, zānhuā). The jifaLi (笄礼), the traditional coming-of-age ceremony for girls at age fifteen, involved the first formal insertion of a hairpin — marking her transition to adulthood and eligibility for marriage. After marriage, women wore their hair in a bun secured with multiple pins (发簪, fàzān): the zān was a single-pronged pin, the chai (钗) had two prongs and was often decorated with pendants that swayed with movement, and the buyao (步摇, "step-shake") featured dangling ornaments that trembled with each step. The fengguan (凤冠, phoenix crown) was the most elaborate Hanfu headpiece — a coronet worn by brides and imperial consorts. Empress Zhu Yousi's wedding coronet, recorded in Ming Dynasty archives, featured: six dragon-and-phoenix panels in gold filigree, 3,426 pearls, 1,728 kingfisher feathers (点翠, diǎncùi), and ninety-five rubies. The kingfisher feather technique, now banned due to the species' protected status, was a uniquely Chinese art form that produced an iridescent blue-green color that no dye could replicate.

=== Embroidered Shoes (绣花鞋) ===
Hanfu footwear followed strict rules of form and color. Men wore black silk boots with white felt soles for formal occasions and plain cloth shoes at home. Women's shoes were elaborately embroidered — the xiuhuaxie (绣花鞋) featured needlework that matched the season and occasion: lotuses for summer, chrysanthemums for autumn, plum blossoms for winter. The curved-toe style (翘头履, qiàotóulǚ), where the toe curved upward into a small hook, was the most distinctive Hanfu shoe shape — it prevented the long robe hem from being stepped on and created a graceful line from hem to toe. During the Tang Dynasty, court ladies wore platform shoes (高头履, gāotóulǚ) with soles up to fifteen centimeters thick, layered with white, blue, and red felt. The height of the platform indicated status — the Empress's platform shoes were the tallest.

=== Incense Pouches (香囊) ===
The xiangnang (香囊) was a small embroidered bag filled with aromatic herbs and spices — typically wormwood, angelica, cinnamon, and musk. Worn at the waist or tucked into the sleeve, it served multiple purposes: warding off evil spirits (herbs were believed to have protective properties), freshening the air, preventing illness, and signaling refined taste. During the Dragon Boat Festival (端午节), children wore especially elaborate incense pouches as protection against disease during the summer months. The xiangnang also functioned as a love token — a woman would embroider a pouch with paired symbols (mandarin ducks, lotuses, butterflies) and fill it with her preferred fragrance, giving it to her beloved as an implicit declaration of affection. The practice was recorded as early as the Han Dynasty and continued unbroken into the twentieth century.

== See also ==
=== Sub-categories of hanfu ===
- Chinese academic dress
- Fengguan
- Guan Li
- Hanfu accessories
- Hanfu footwear
- List of hanfu
- List of hanfu headwear
- Mandarin square
- Qixiong ruqun
- Shanku
- Yuanlingshan

=== Other clothing in the Sinosphere ===
- Hanbok (Korean traditional clothing)
- Kimono (Wafuku – Japanese traditional clothing)
- Ryusou (Okinawan traditional clothing)
- Vietnamese áo giao lĩnh (Việt phục – Vietnamese traditional clothing)
- Chinoiserie fashion, including wrap dress and top
- Qizhuang

== Bibliography ==
- Hua, Mei (華梅) (2004). 【古代服飾】 [Ancient Costume]. Beijing: Wenmu Chubanshe. ISBN 978-7-5010-1472-9.
- Huang, Nengfu (黃能馥); Chen, Juanjuan (陳娟娟) (1999). 【中華歷代服飾藝術】 [The Art of Chinese Clothing Through the Ages]. Beijing: 中国旅游出版社.
- Shen, Congwen (2006). Zhongguo gu dai fu shi yan jiu 【中國古代服飾研究】 [Researches on Ancient Chinese Costumes]. Shanghai: Shanghai Century Publishing Group. ISBN 978-7-80678-329-0.
- Xu, Jialu (許嘉璐) (1991). 【中國古代禮俗辭典】 [Dictionary of Rituals and Customs of Ancient China].
- Zhang, Qizhi (2015). An introduction to Chinese history and culture. Heidelberg, Germany: Heidelberg Springer. ISBN 978-3-662-46482-3. OCLC 909065833.
- Zhou, Xun; Gao, Chunming (1984). 5000 Years of Chinese Costume. Hong Kong: The Commercial Press; The Chinese Costumes Research Group. ISBN 962-07-5021-7.
  - Zhou, Xun; Gao, Chunming (1988). 5000 Years of Chinese Costumes. San Francisco: China Books & Periodicals. ISBN 978-0-8351-1822-4.
- Zhou, Xibao (1984). 【中國古代服飾史】 [History of Ancient Chinese Costume]. Beijing: Zhongguo Xiju.
