= Audi Fashion Festival Singapore =

Fashion Festival

The Audi Fashion Festival Singapore (or Singapore Fashion Week) is a series of annual fashion trade events held in Singapore since 1988.

It was known as Fashion Connection between 1988 and 2000, Singapore Fashion Week between 2001 and 2008, and Audi Fashion Festival Singapore after gaining titular sponsorship from Audi in 2009. The event was again rebranded as Singapore Fashion Week in 2015 despite still being known as the 'Audi Fashion Festival Singapore'.

The event is not to be confused with the Singapore Fashion Festival, which also ran between 2001 and 2008, but was supported by the Singapore Tourism Board (STB). The Singapore Fashion Festival eventually became the Asia Fashion Exchange (AFX) in 2010, and hosts the Audi Fashion Festival Singapore as part of its flagship event.

The last event is expected to be in 2017 as current event chairman Tjin Lee is setting her sights on expanding regionally.

== 2009 - 2014 ==
Audi Fashion Festival (AFF) was a fashion festival that took place in May every year from 2009 to 2014. Incepted in 2009, it replaced the Singapore Fashion Week, and welcomed consumers to conventionally by-invite only shows for media and trade. It was held at Tent@Orchard in the heart of the Orchard Road fashion belt from 2009 to 2012, and 2014. In 2013, AFF moved to Marina Promenade.

Organized by Mercury Marketing & Communications, AFF was the first privately funded consumer fashion event, with Audi as the titular sponsor. It was a high-profile platform for both international and Asian emerging and established designers. During its run, the festival showcased collections by a host of top international designers and labels such as Prabal Gurung, Oscar de la Renta, Christian Lacroix, Vivienne Westwood, Gareth Pugh, Marc by Marc Jacobs, Missoni, Ungaro, Erdem, DSquared, Roberto Cavalli, Mugler, Zac Posen, Roland Mouret, Carolina Herrera, Tsumori Chisato, Peter Pilotto and Hussein Chalayan. On top of international designers, Singaporean designers showcased at AFF. The number of local labels doubled from 2013 to 2014, with four local labels – Hansel, Ong Shunmugam, Exhibit, and Saturday – showcasing at Audi Fashion Festival 2014.

=== 2009 Audi Fashion Festival ===
The 2009 fashion festival took place at the TENT@ORCHARD from 6 to 10 May 2009. Singapore's fashion elite gathered for the nation's biggest scale fashion event at the newly minted Audi Fashion Festival – marking the first ever privately owned fashion festival. Organized by Mercury Marketing and Communications, the festival welcomed fashion's biggest and hottest names including Christian Lacroix, Gareth Pugh, Vivienne Westwood, Jacquetta Wheeler, Ashley Isham, RAOUL, Marc by Marc Jacobs, Mango, and Singapore's creative crop from BlackMarket, Nicholas by Nic Wong and Hansel by Jo Soh.

‘Driving Innovation and Inspiration' was the theme for the inaugural Audi Fashion Festival 2009 and the festival certainly lived up to that note with a spectacular string of shows that inspired, dazzled and rocked the region. There were many firsts; first haute couture collection to be showcased on such a grand scale on Orchard Road, Gareth Pugh first catwalk presentation of his Fall 2009 women's and men's collection, and Ashley Isham's debut of ethereal yet elegant bridal gowns.

The five show-filled days of Audi Fashion Festival drew a strong 7000 guests, with a sell-out six ticketed shows. Audi Fashion Festival 2009 wrapped up as the most glamorous and dazzling event of the fashion and social calendar with Vivienne Westwood's Anglomania Autumn/Winter 09-10 collection. Dame Vivienne Westwood was also awarded Audi Lifetime Achievement Award, with Commercial Director Giuseppe Aragoni in town to accept on her behalf.

== 2015 - present ==
In 2015, the event was rebranded as Singapore Fashion Week (SGFW) although it is still referred to as the Audi Fashion Festival Singapore.

The event is organized by Mercury Marketing & Communications.

=== Singapore Fashion Week 2015 ===
The fashion event claimed the name Singapore Fashion Week and returned with a revamped format. SGFW broadened its scope to include industry development. One initiative was the SGFW Fashion Talk Series – a series of thought-leadership and industry talks organized in partnership with LASALLE College of the Arts.

In 2015, SGFW introduced strategic global alliances. SGFW partnered with the Council of Fashion Designers of America (CFDA), which saw CFDA members Diane von Furstenberg and Thakoon Panichgul showcasing their latest collections as part of the tie up. SGFW's partnership with UK Trade & Investment (UKTI) saw British designer and UK’S "GREAT" campaign ambassador Victoria Beckham presenting her Autumn/Winter 2015 collection at SGFW 2015.

To support homegrown talent, SGFW introduced Fashion Futures, a new talent development programme to internationalize Singapore designers. Singaporean designers Priscilla Shunmugam of Ong Shunmugam, Sabrina Goh of ELOHIM, and Chelsea Schott-Blackhall of Dzojchen presented as part of the pilot edition of Fashion Futures.

=== Singapore Fashion Week 2016 ===
The Singapore Fashion Week returns in 2016 with a new date, location and initiatives. The 2016 edition took place in October instead of May, from 26 to 30 October, in order to align with international Fashion Weeks. The new date allows designers to showcase Spring/Summer collections that are more suited to the region's tropical climate instead of Fall/Winter collections that were previously showcased when the festival was held in May. Further, a six-month calendar of fashion and industry-related activities made accessible to the public would culminate in the Singapore Fashion Week held in October.

SGFW 2016 was held at National Gallery Singapore, housed in two national monuments in the heart of the Civic District – the former Supreme Court and City Hall. At the new location, SGFW would feature a curved runway with more than 350 front row seats, instead of conventional theatre-style seating, for a novel guest experience.

The 2016 edition will include Digital Fashion Week (DFW) after its acquisition by SGFW, which would welcome a larger digital presence for SGFW. DFW is a designer showcase formerly targeted at young designers with an emphasis on online and social media. It has supported more than 50 local designers through fashion events and runway shows held annually in Singapore and Bangkok. Viewers can enjoy 360° virtual reality and live streaming of SGFW content via the Digital Fashion Week’s online portal.

In addition to SGFW Gallery, SGFW introduced Singapore Fashion Week Access – an industry-support platform that aims to support the Singapore fashion industry by providing designers and businesses opportunities to exhibit their collections through smaller scale, flexible-format fashion presentations.

SGFW turns the spotlight on Asian talents with the participation of top names in fashion such as Chinese couturier Guo Pei, Indian-American fashion designer Naeem Khan, and London-based designer Han Chong who is behind contemporary womenswear label Self-Portrait. For the first time ever, a Singaporean designer – Max Tan of MAX.TAN – will open the fashion week at SGFW Access.

=== Singapore Fashion Week 2017 ===
The last Singapore Fashion Week took place on 26 to 28 October 2017.
