= Asia Fashion Exchange =

Fashion festival held in Singapore

The Asia Fashion Exchange (AFX) is an annual fashion festival held in Singapore between 2001 and 2015. It began in 2001 as the Singapore Fashion Festival and was conceived by the Singapore Tourism Board (STB) with the goal of positioning Singapore as a fashion capital within Southeast Asia. The festival was eventually relaunched as the Asia Fashion Exchange in 2010 as a joint initiative between the private and public sector, and features a variety of fashion-related events.

The flagship event of the Asia Fashion Exchange is the Audi Fashion Festival Singapore. In 2015, Audi Fashion Festival Singapore was rebranded as Singapore Fashion Week and it was the last year that the Asia Fashion Exchange was marketed as its parent event.

== 2001 – 2008: Singapore Fashion Festival ==
AFX began as Singapore Fashion Festival, an annual two-week long consumer-driven event that took place between 2001 and 2008. It was supported by the Singapore Tourism Board (STB), which aimed to position Singapore as a fashion capital within Southeast Asia. The event consisted of showcases by international and local designers, exhibitions and fashion-related fringe events. The event was organized by MS Twilight, an events management company, from 2001 to 2003. In 2004, Mercury Marketing and Communications, now a fully integrated communications agency, won the contract to organize the Singapore Fashion Festival.

The first Singapore Fashion Festival in 2001 hoped to present high fashion in a “fun and entertaining way” to consumers. It saw big names in high fashion such as Kenzo and Christian Dior presenting their collections. Zouk’s carpark was converted into a fashion catwalk for labels like Armani Exchange, Blackjack and Island Shop to showcase their collections.

=== 2006 Singapore Fashion Festival ===
The 2006 Festival was a ten-day event held from 24 March to 2 April 2006. It was considered the best fashion festival for both international and local designers in Singapore. The most anticipated model taking the catwalk at this year's festival was British supermodel, Lily Cole.

The festival was located in a tent at Ngee Ann City, on Orchard Road. More than 30 brands signed up, with most of them displaying their spring-summer designs, and with some displaying their autumn-winter designs. The collections on display were also sold at the event.

In addition to the catwalks, MTV's Fashionably Loud, performed at Ngee Ann City. Featured in the performance was UK's rock favorites Placebo who performed a mixture of old hits and new tracks from their upcoming new album Meds. They were also accompanied by a variety of fashion labels showcasing designs inspired by "Rock Resurrection" portraying themes of destruction, renewal, grief, and joy.

== 2010 – 2014: Asia Fashion Exchange ==
In January 2010, government enterprise body SPRING Singapore announced the launch of Asia Fashion Exchange (AFX) to be held in April 2010. The event consisted of four pillars, a trade show Blueprint, a fashion business conference Asia Fashion Summit, and a fashion designer competition Audi Star Creation and the week-long Audi Fashion Festival.

=== Asia Fashion Exchange 2010 ===
Asia Fashion Exchange (AFX) launched in April 2010 as to position Singapore as a fashion center on the international stage. AFX launched as part of a joint effort by International Enterprise (IE) Singapore, SPRING Singapore (SPRING), the Singapore Tourism Board (STB) and the private sector. To be held annually, the AFX will help the industry to develop a strong base of local design talent, stimulate demand for local fashion brands locally and internationally, and position Singapore as a gateway to Asian designers and markets. AFX took place from 27 April to 2 May 2010 and showcased events such as Asia Fashion Summit, Audi Fashion Festival, Blueprint and Star Creation.

=== Asia Fashion Exchange 2011 ===
Asia Fashion Exchange (AFX) 2011 took place from 11 to 22 May 2011, comprising consumer, trade and industry events. Following on its successful inaugural run in 2010, the Asia Fashion Exchange (AFX) will once again make its mark on Singapore's fashion calendar in May. Comprising a comprehensive and holistic programme of events for trade and consumer, as well as networking and talent development, AFX aimed to develop the long-term sustainability of Singapore's fashion industry by building capability and profiling Asian talent on an international platform and to position Singapore as Asia's Fashion Capital. AFX is a joint private and public sector initiative involving the Textile and Fashion Federation of Singapore (TaFf), Mercury Marketing and Communications and government agencies, International Enterprise (IE) Singapore, SPRING Singapore (SPRING) and the Singapore Tourism Board (STB).

=== Asia Fashion Exchange 2012 ===
Asia Fashion Exchange 2012 takes place from 14 to 20 May 2012, comprising consumer, trade and industry events. Riding on its successful run in the past two years, the Asia Fashion Exchange (AFX) celebrates its third year in May with a stellar line-up of events. A unified platform that brings together Singapore's four key fashion events – Audi Fashion Festival Singapore, BLUEPRINT, Audi Star Creation and Asia Fashion Summit – AFX covers all aspects of the fashion industry, from consumer events and trade shows to business conferences and talent development programmes. In doing so, AFX aims to provide a focal point for Asian and international fashion professionals across a broad spectrum of the fashion industry to network and exchange ideas in Singapore.

Growing from strength to strength, AFX 2012 will offer stronger Asia-centric content with an international appeal. Fashion enthusiasts can look forward to more international big names as well as greater support for emerging designers at Audi Fashion Festival Singapore, a wider variety of brands at BLUEPRINT with the addition of The Brandery Asia, more entries and higher quality of participants at Audi Star Creation and a stronger line-up of speakers and content to engage the Asian fashion consumer for Asia Fashion Summit.

=== Asia Fashion Exchange 2013 ===
Asia Fashion Exchange (AFX) 2013 took place from 13 to 19 May 2013. AFX 2013 has moved one step further towards becoming a comprehensive fashion platform with a new concept Fashion by the Bay. All four pillars of AFX will be physically integrated into one location at Marina Promenade. With Singapore's famous skyline and Gardens by the Bay in the backdrop, visitors can look forward to more glitz and glamour with notable fashion figures, fashion enthusiasts and industry professionals across the globe networking in one location. AFX aims to position Singapore as Asia's leading fashion hub, and is made up of four pillar events. These are BLUEPRINT, a trade show that positions itself as the fashion trade gateway to Asia which creates business opportunities between international buyers and promising design players; Asia Fashion Summit, a premier business conference that generates thought leadership content and insights on fashion topics for industry professionals; Audi Fashion Festival Singapore, a showcase of world-class collections by top and emerging designers and labels, both international and Asian; and Audi Star Creation, a regional fashion design competition to spot budding talent. AFX is a joint private and public sector initiative involving the Textile and Fashion Federation of Singapore (TaFf), Mercury Marketing and Communications and government agencies, International Enterprise (IE) Singapore, SPRING Singapore (SPRING) and Singapore Tourism Board (STB).

Asia Fashion Exchange (AFX) celebrates its fourth year in May by consolidating all its key fashion events at one location. For the first time, all four pillars of AFX will be physically unified at the dazzling Marina Promenade, in the heart of the city, which forms part of the circuit of the world's only Formula One night race. The new integrated fashion lifestyle concept, called Fashion by the Bay, allows for a more comprehensive networking platform and easier exchange of ideas between Asian and international fashion professionals, across a broad spectrum of the fashion industry.

=== Asia Fashion Exchange 2014 ===
Asia Fashion Exchange (AFX) 2014 took place from 15 – 18 May 2014. AFX aims to position Singapore as Asia's leading fashion hub and is made up of four pillar events. The four key fashion pillars of AFX includes Audi Fashion Festival Singapore, BLUEPRINT, Audi Star Creation and Asia Fashion Summit.
