= Priscilla Shunmugam =

Singaporean fashion designer (born 1981)

Priscilla Tsu-Jyen Shunmugam (born 17 July 1981) is a Malaysian-Singaporean womenswear designer. She is the founder and designer of the womenswear label Ong Shunmugam. Her company is named after the surnames of her Chinese mother and Indian father. Her clothes have featured in Paris Fashion Week and stocked in Pixie Market, a New York based company.

== Early life ==
Shunmugam was born in Kuala Lumpur, Malaysia, to a Chinese mother and an Indian father. At age 20, she was accepted to read law at the National University of Singapore. Upon graduation in 2006, Shunmugam worked briefly as a lawyer before leaving the profession. In 2008, she spent a year in England, where she studied dressmaking and pattern cutting.

== Career ==
She returned to Singapore in 2009, and launched the debut Ong Shunmugam collection, Orientalism, in December 2010. Guardianship, a collection of modern cheongsams, followed in September 2011. The name of the company is an amalgamation of the surnames of her Chinese mother and Indian father. Shunmugam has stated that the transition from law to fashion was a "very hard time" as she made a lot less than as a lawyer initially, though she has since broke even and has become more comfortable financially.

In May 2012, Shunmugam was invited by the National Museum of Singapore to present a public lecture as part of its landmark In The Mood For Cheongsam exhibition. "Cheongsam, Dim Sum or Me?" explored the cheongsam's history through several identity changes in the context of Singapore's past, present and future. Shunmugam and the Guardianship cheongsams were also featured in the Museum-produced book of the same name.

In August 2012, Shunmugam was the only woman in fashion to be featured in Style Magazine Singapore's 10th Anniversary's list of The New Guard – a shortlist of “game-changers and taste-makers doing things their way”.

In November 2012, she was voted Singapore Designer of the Year at the 2012 Elle Awards in Singapore. In 2015, she was named as Her World magazine's Young Woman Achiever.

In 2020, she announced the launch of her first overseas boutique but it was shut due to COVID-19 even before it was officially opened to the public.

Ong is said to be a "leading figure in the Asian design community", whose brand is inspired by the "cultural complexities of Malaysia and Singapore." In mid-2024, she collaborated with The Coconut Club, a Food and Beverage establishment, on a fashion collection.

== Controversy ==
In March 2022, Shunmugam had made racist remarks during an online panel discussion entitled "ACMTalks" organised by the Asian Civilisations Museum during 2021. She has since apologized for these comments, accepting that her comments were "clumsy, hurtful and insensitive".
