= Qipao =

Fitted dress in Chinese culture

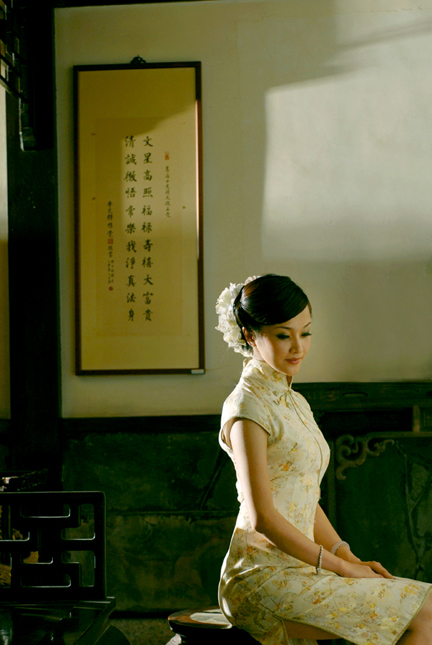
- A woman in a qipao
- Type: Dress / female outwear
- Material: Diverse, such as silk, silk-like material, cotton
- Place of origin: China
- Introduced: 20th century

Qipao
- "Cheongsam" in Traditional (top) and Simplified (bottom) Chinese characters

- Qipao (Chinese characters)
- Traditional Chinese: 長衫
- Simplified Chinese: 长衫
- Literal meaning: long garment
Transcriptions
Standard Mandarin
- Hanyu Pinyin: chángshān
- Bopomofo: ㄔㄤˊ ㄕㄢ
- IPA: [ʈʂʰǎŋʂán]
Yue: Cantonese
- Yale Romanization: chèuhng-sāam
- Jyutping: coeng^{4}-saam^{1}
- IPA: [tsʰœŋ˩sam˥]
Southern Min
- Hokkien POJ: tn̂g-sann
- Tâi-lô: tn̂g-saⁿ

Qipao
- Chinese: 旗袍
- Literal meaning: banner gown
Transcriptions
Standard Mandarin
- Hanyu Pinyin: qípáo
- Wade–Giles: ch'i^{2}-p'ao^{2}
- IPA: [tɕʰǐpʰǎʊ]
Yue: Cantonese
- Yale Romanization: kèih pòuh
- Jyutping: kei4 pou4-2
Southern Min
- Hokkien POJ: kî-phâu
- Tâi-lô: kî-phâu

The qipao (/ˈtʃiːpaʊ/; Chinese: 旗袍; pinyin: qípáo; lit. 'banner gown'), also known as the cheongsam (UK: /tʃ(i)ɒŋˈsæm/, US: /tʃɔːŋˈsɑːm/; simplified Chinese: 长衫; traditional Chinese: 長衫; pinyin: chángshān; lit. 'long shirt') or the mandarin gown, is a Western-influenced Chinese dress worn by women which takes inspiration from the qizhuang, the ethnic clothing of the Manchu people. The cheongsam is most often seen as a longer, figure-fitting, one piece garment with a standing collar, an asymmetric, left-over-right (youren) opening and two side slits, and embellished with Chinese frog fasteners on the lapel and the collar.

The qipao was developed in the 1910s-1920s and evolved in shapes and design over years. It was popular in China from the 1920s to the 1960s, overlapping with the Republican era, and was popularized by Chinese socialites and high society women in Shanghai.

== Terminology ==
As English loanwords, both cheongsam and qipao describe the same type of body-hugging dress worn by Chinese women, and the words can be used interchangeably.

The term cheongsam is a romanization of the Cantonese word chèuhngsāam (長衫; 'long shirt/dress'), which comes from the Shanghainese term zansae. In Cantonese and Shanghainese, the term denotes a Chinese dress that gained popularity in Shanghai. However, in Mandarin Chinese and other varieties of Chinese, chángshān (長衫) refers to a garment exclusively for men, and the version for women is known as the qípáo. In Hong Kong, where many Shanghainese tailors fled after the communist revolution of 1949, the word chèuhngsāam became gender-neutral, referring to both male and female garments.

The word qipao (keipo), which literally means 'banner gown', (Note: when translated in a gender-neutral way, as the word primarily refers to the women's dress in modern Chinese usage) or 'bannerman' (Note: or 'bannerwoman', when referring to clothing worn by Manchu women in certain contexts) robe, which originally referred to a loose-fitting, trapezoidal-cut garment worn by both Manchu men and women, has become a more formal term for the women's chèuhngsāam. Usage of the term cheongsam in Western countries mostly follows the original Cantonese meaning and applies to the dress worn by women only.

== Design and construction ==
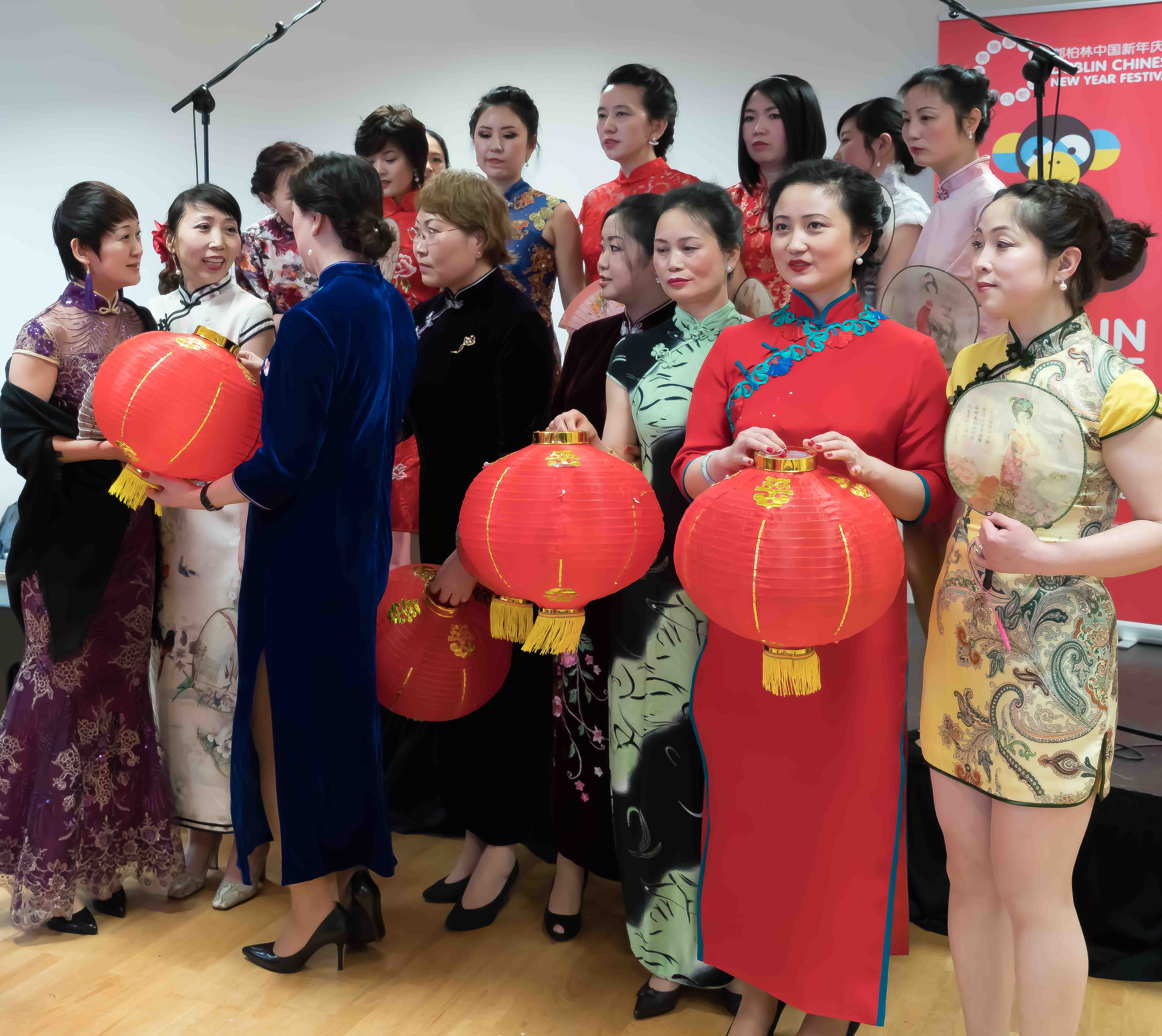
Chinese community in Dublin wearing various styles of cheongsam, 2016

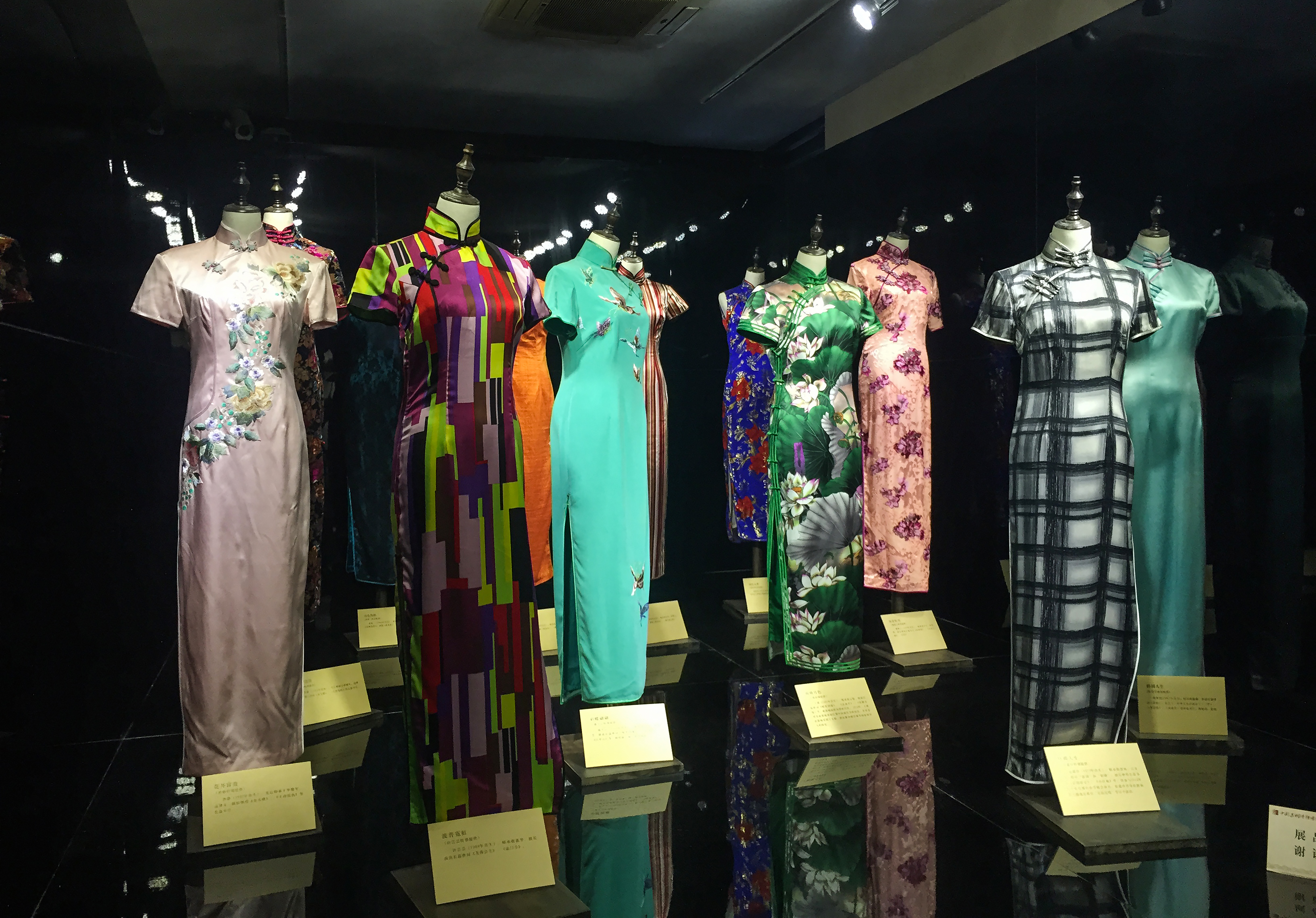
An exhibition of cheongsam worn by Suzhou pingtan performers

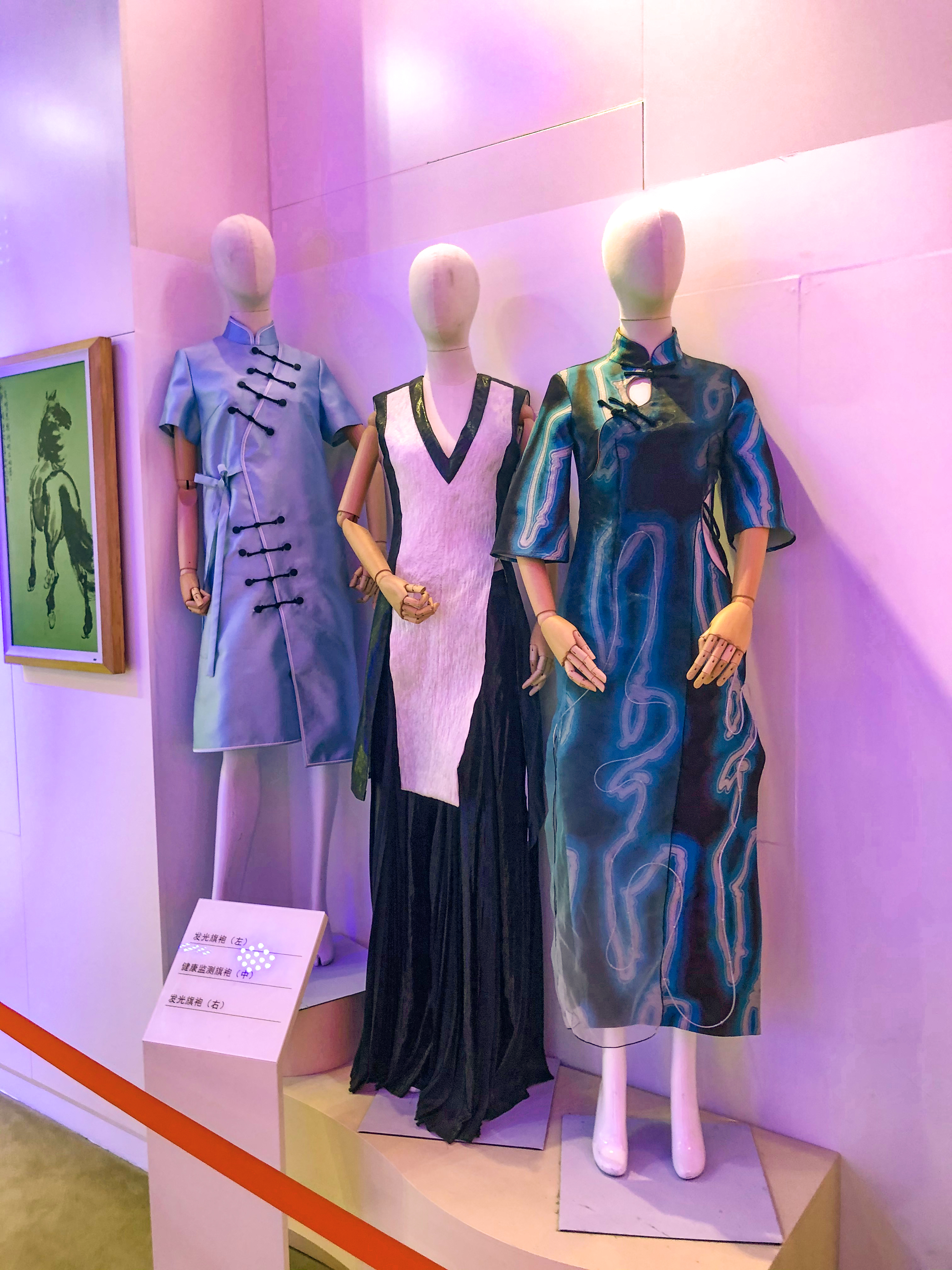
Different designs of cheongsam

The design of the cheongsam has evolved with time; and there are now a various styles of cheongsam. However, after decades of development, the design of cheongsam itself can be roughly categorized into the Beijing style, the Shanghai style, and the Hong Kong style.

=== General characteristics and features ===
The cheongsam is typically a tight-fitting dress, with a pair of high side slits above the knee-level. The length of the cheongsam can vary; it can be either long or short. It is more often seen with short sleeves; however, it can also be sleeveless.

==== Collars and neckline ====
Various shape of neckline
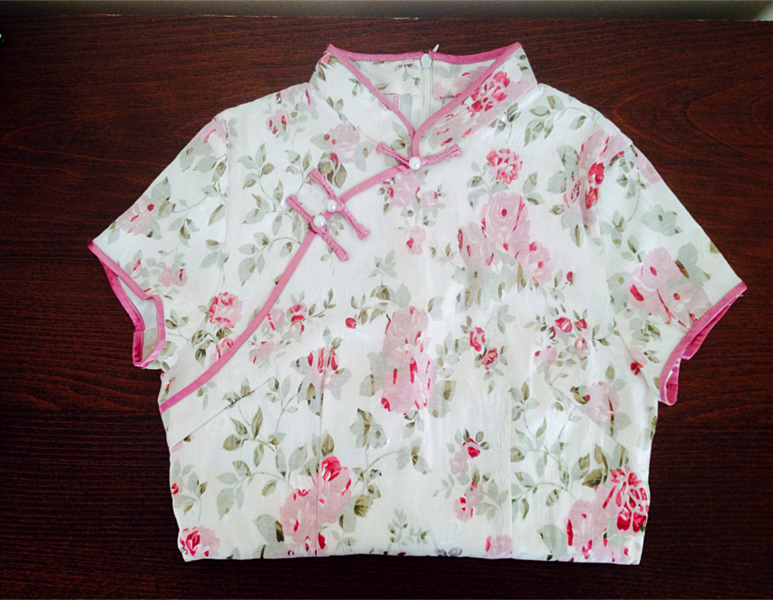
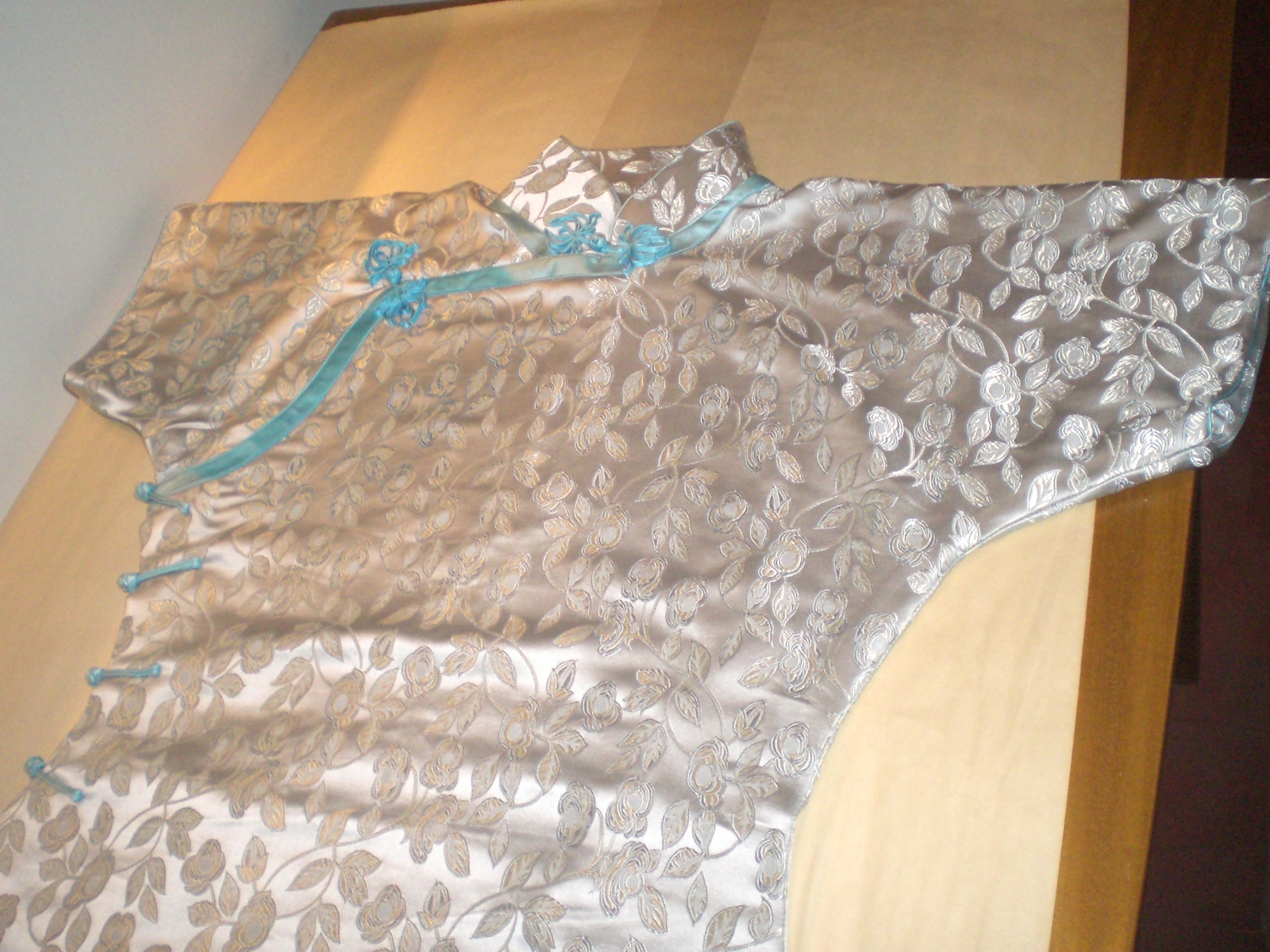
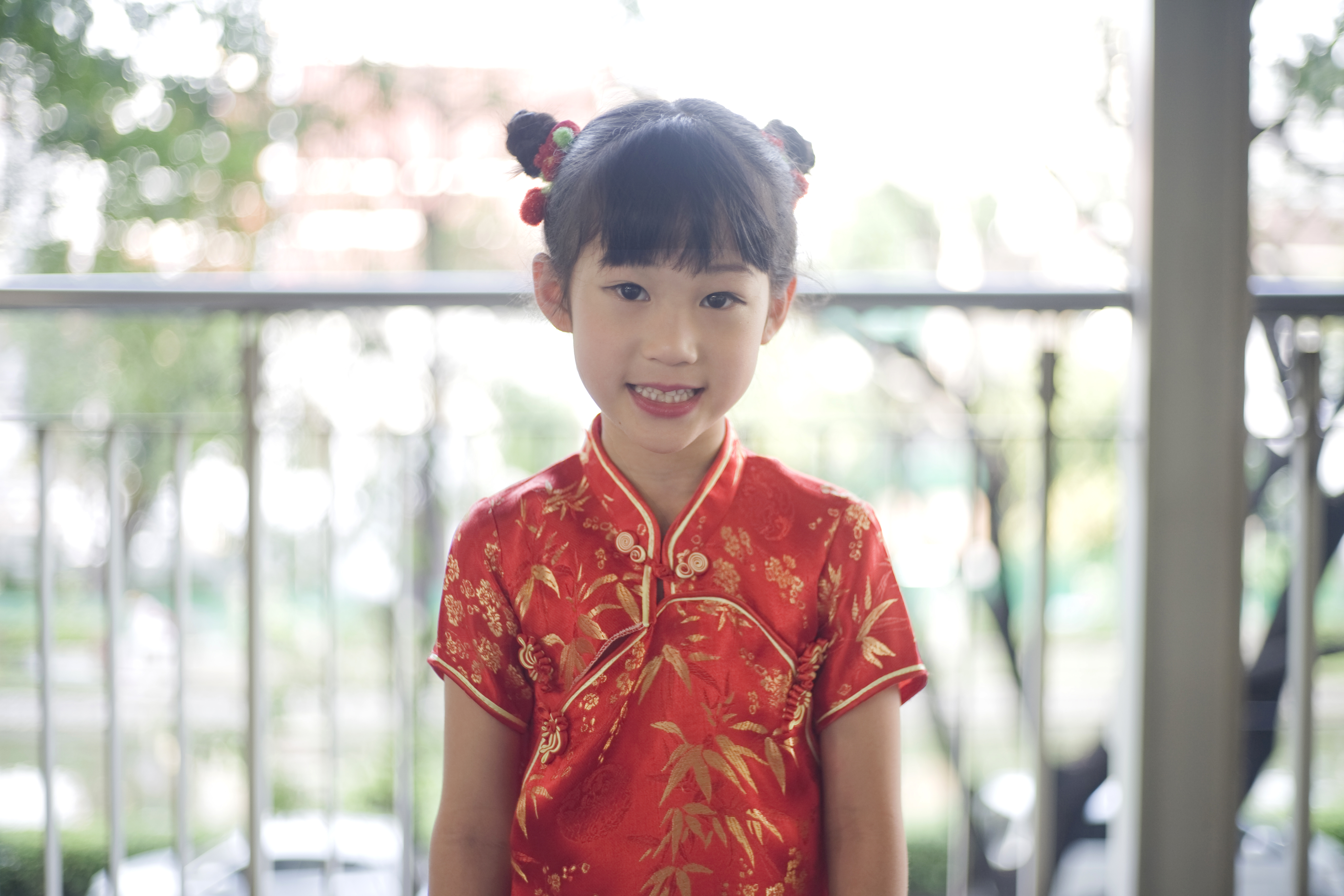
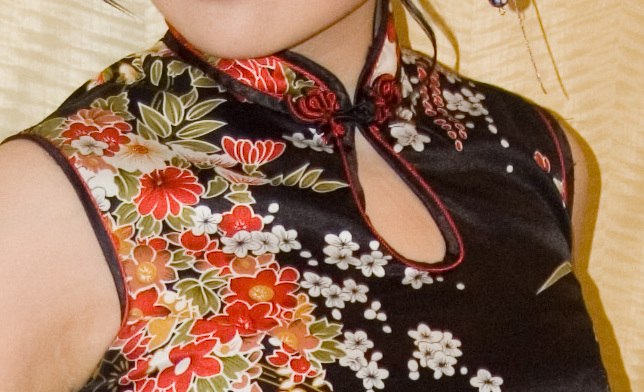

It is typically found with the mandarin collar and has asymmetric closure which runs from the central collar across the top area of the chest to the armhole curing down to the right side. In Chinese clothing culture, the overlap on the right side is known as youren. However, the cheongsam is not limited to the asymmetrical youren closure; there are various styles of cheongsam necklines, including a symmetrical opening in the chest area.

==== Fasteners and closures ====
The fasteners uses traditional Chinese knotting craftwork with the use of the pankou fastening and Chinese button knot.

==== Edges and piping ====
Edges and piping

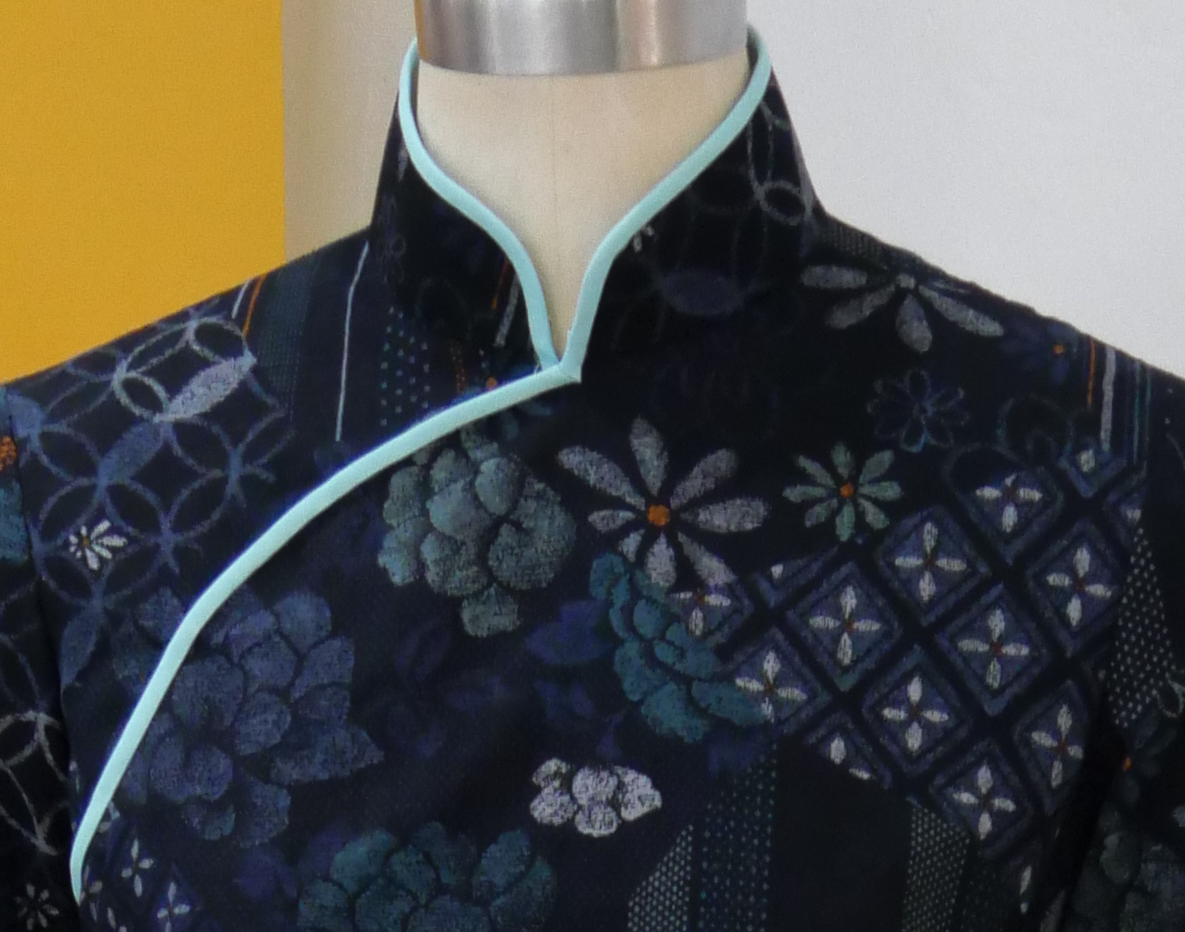
Gun piping at the collar and front overlap

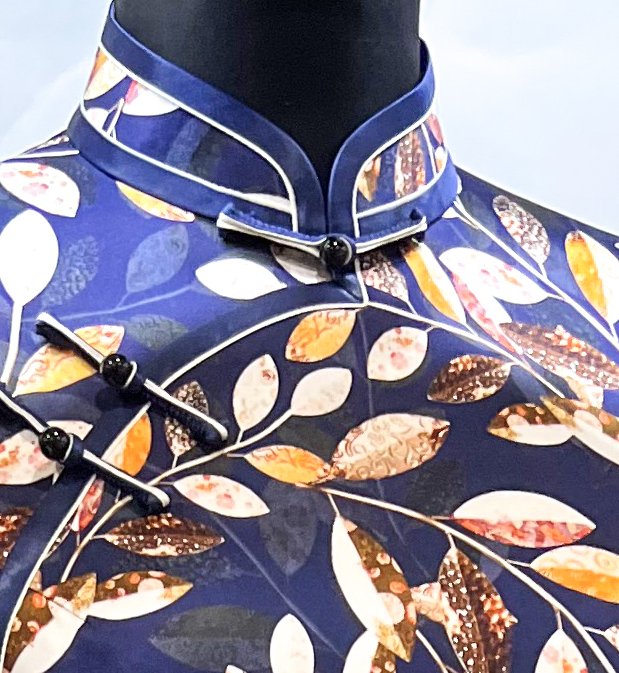
Yigun yiqian: the gun is dark purple while the qian is white.

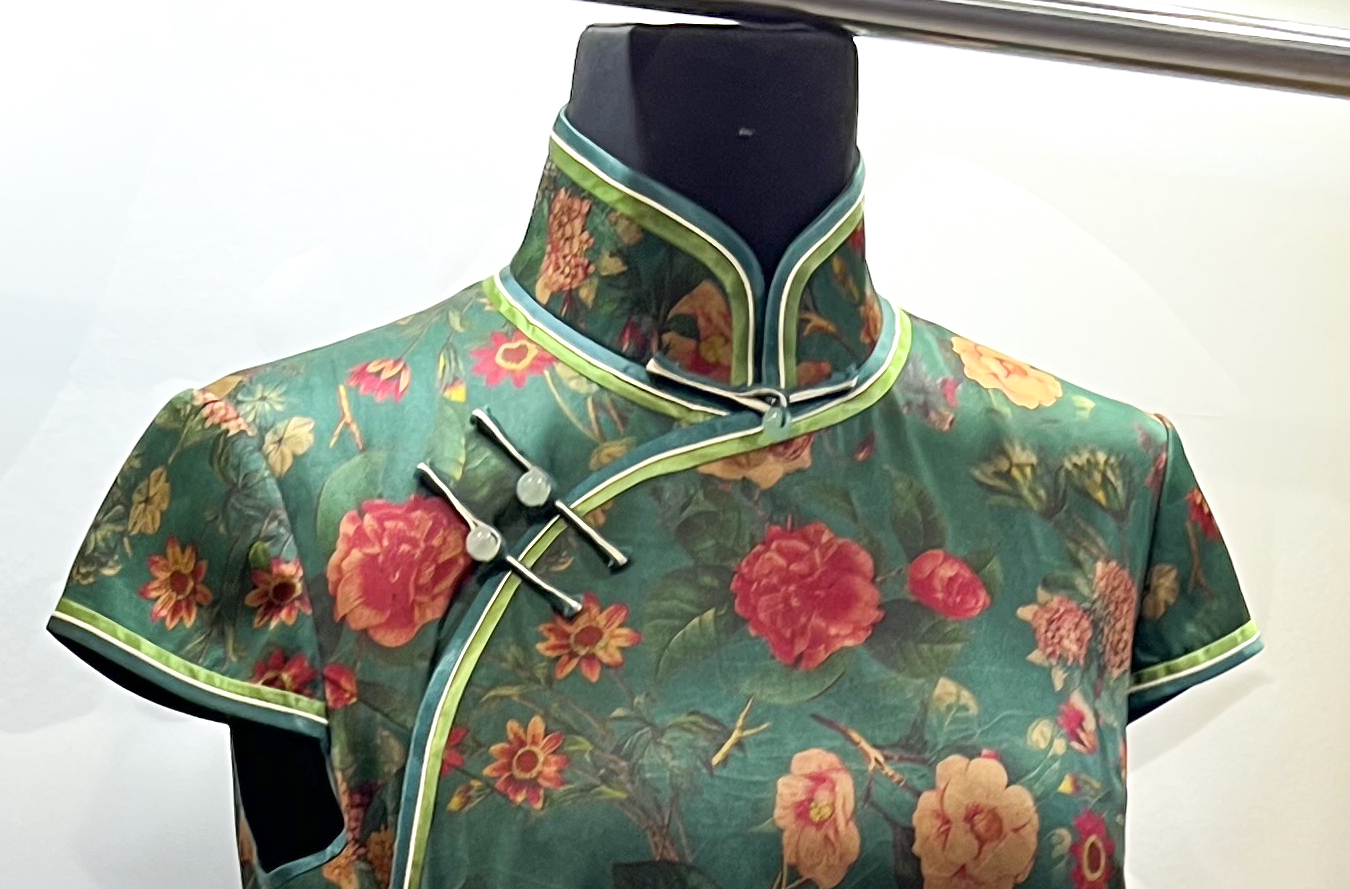
Triple-edged piping (two-gun-one-qian)

The cheongsam is typically edged with piping, especially at the collar and the closure. There are four traditional piping techniques used in the making of the cheongsam: gun (滚; 'roll') which is a narrow strips of fabric roll around the raw edge of the garment and is the most commonly used nowadays, xiang (镶) which is broad edging typically found in Manchu clothing of the Qing dynasty and the early cheongsam and is now quite rare, qian (嵌) is a very narrow strip of fabric which is even narrower than the gun, and dang (宕) is a specific type of xiang technique which uses a narrow strip of fabric which is stitched on the dress.

It is also typical for the qian and the gun to be used together on the same dress creating a double-edged look; this technique is known as yigun yiqian (一滚一嵌; 'one gun one qian'). Other double-edged piping technique include “two-gun-one-qian” and the “two-gun-two-qian”. The dang can also be combined with the gun; in this combination, the dang and the gun would be made of the same width and colour of fabric but they would run parallel to each other about two to five centimeters away from each other.

==== Fabric and textile ====
Different materials can be used in the making of the cheongsam, such as wool, silk (including silk floss, damask, brocade, satin), or silk-like materials. The cheongsam can also be unlined or interlined. The fabric of the cheongsam can decorated with a diversity of decorative motifs, which can be embroidered on the dress.

=== Main styles ===
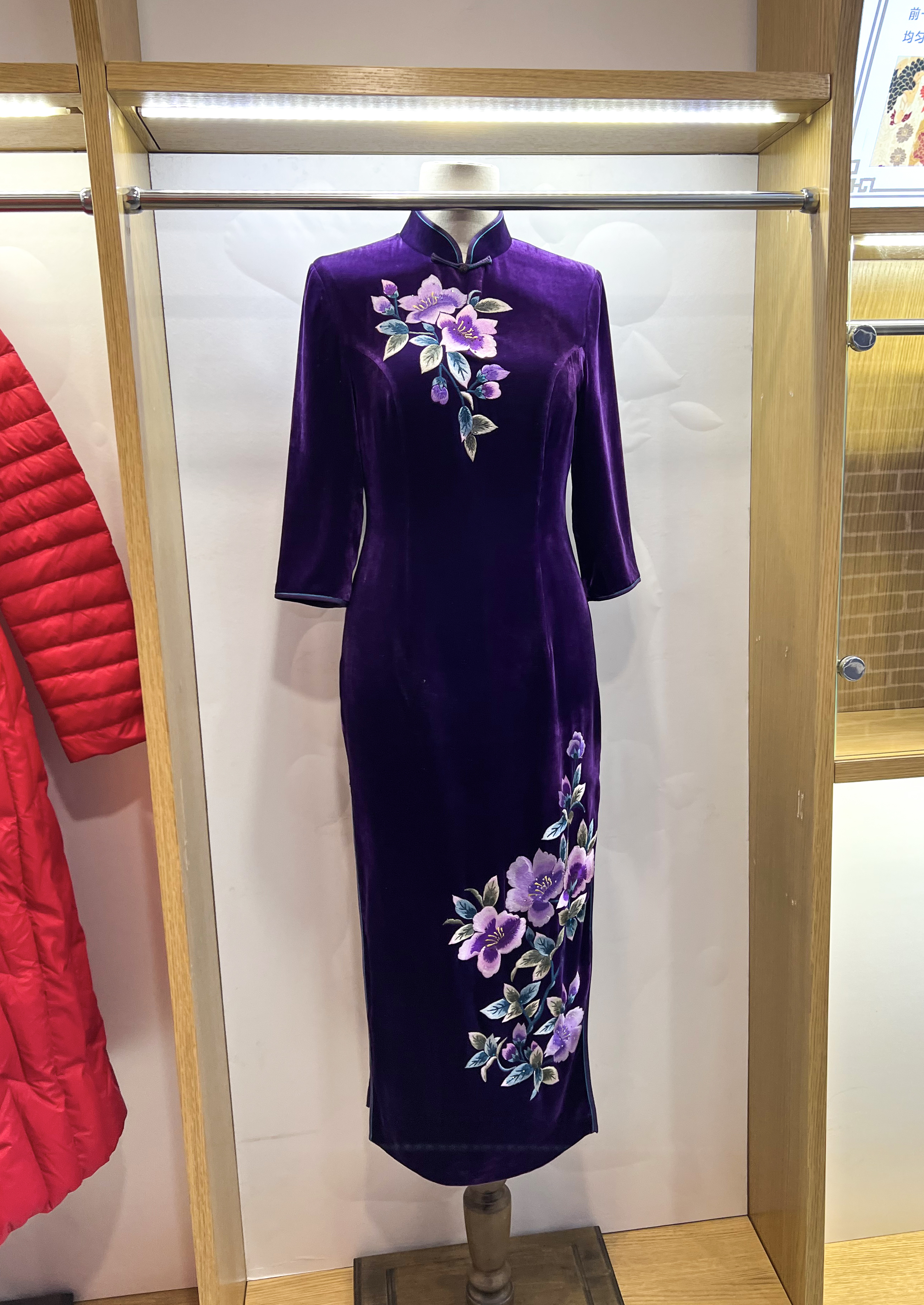
Beijing-style cheongsam

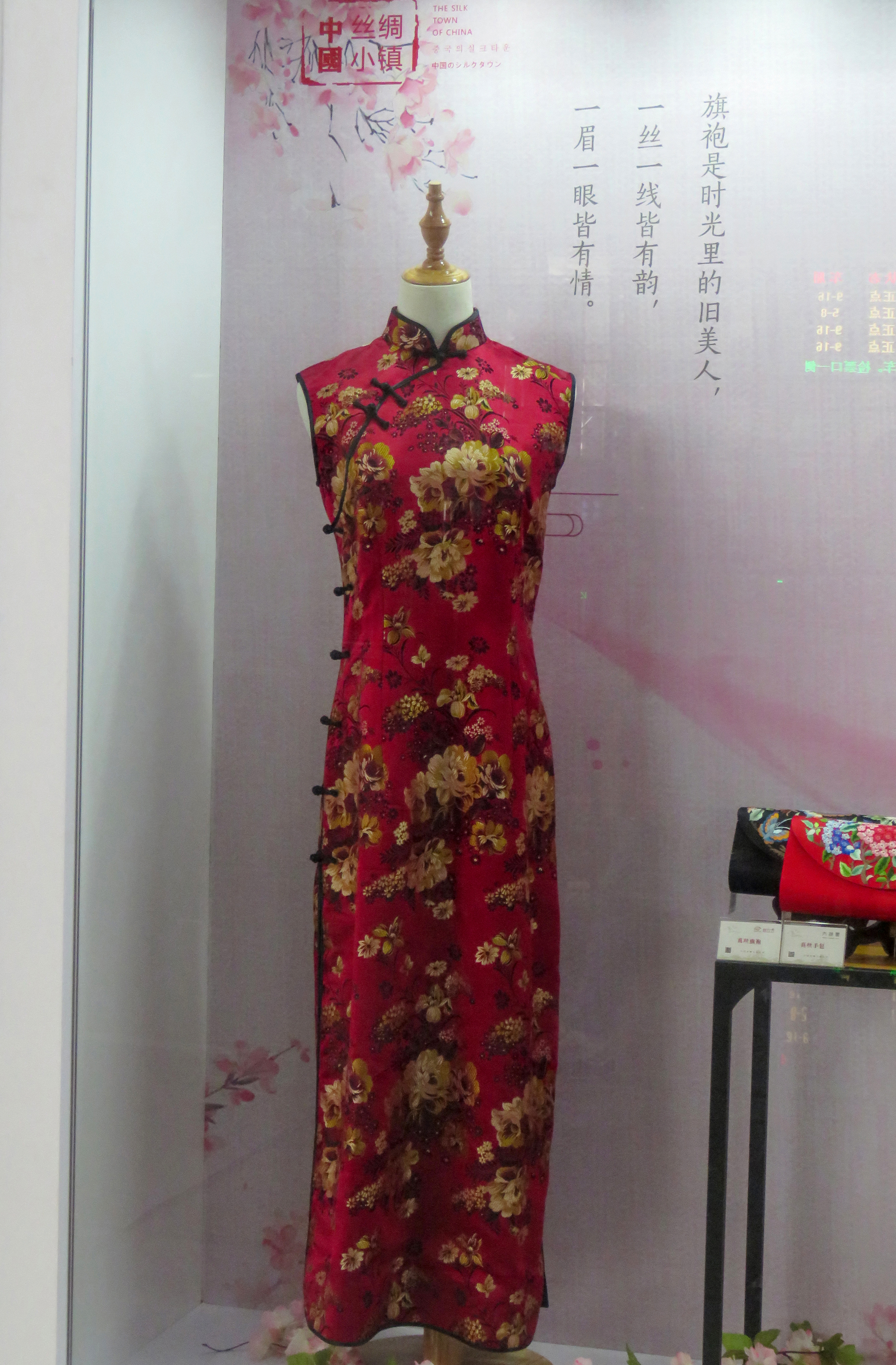
Shanghai-style cheongsam

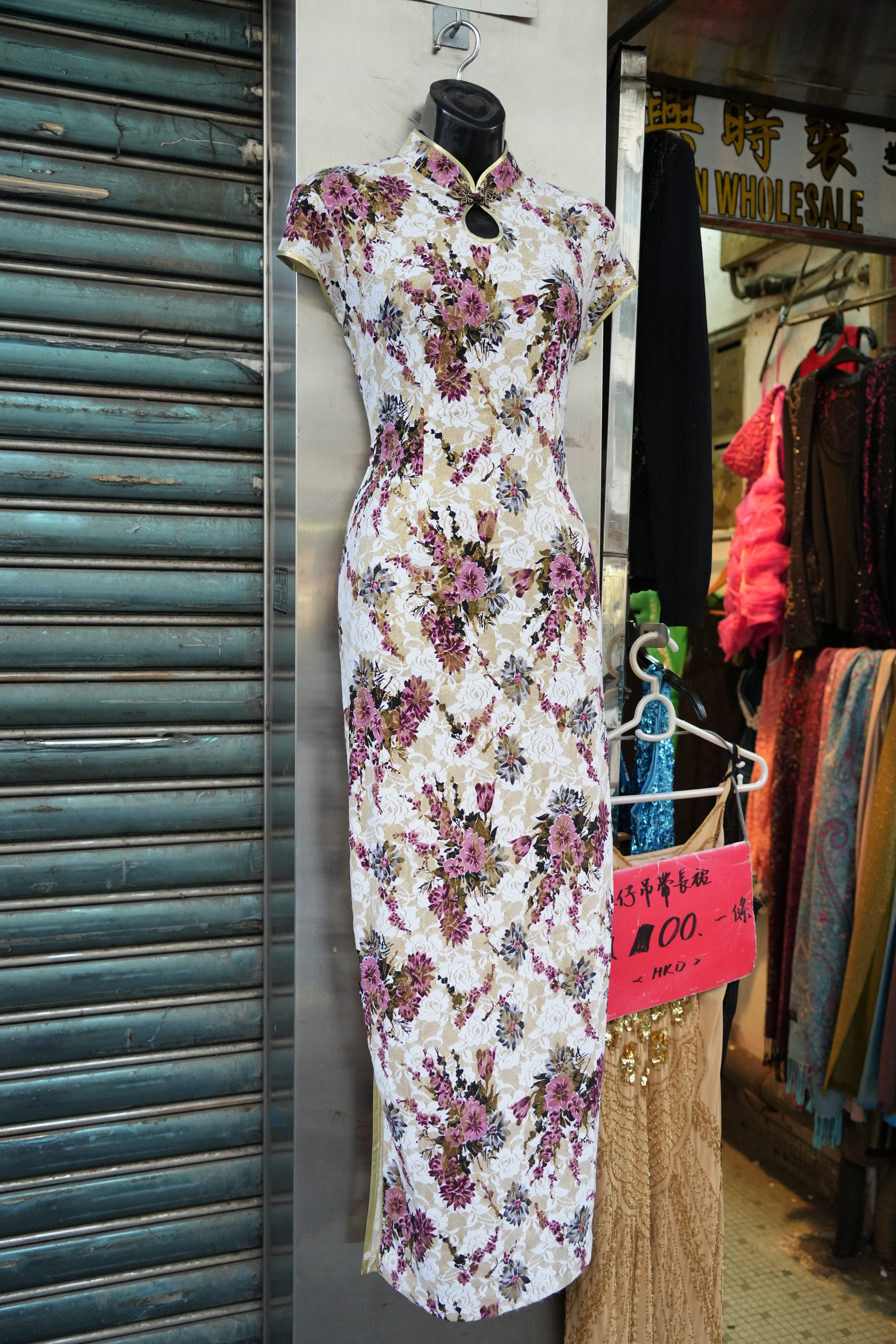
Cantonese-style cheongsam

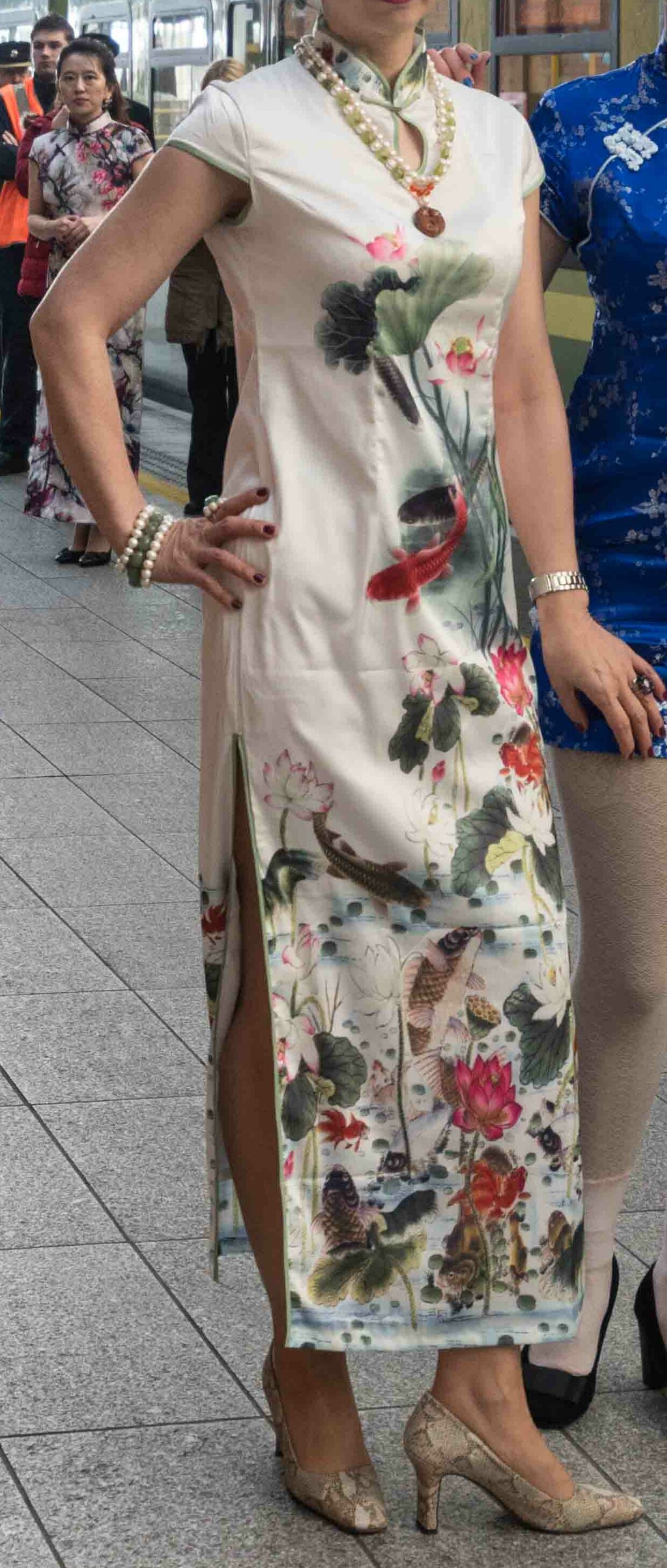
Jiangnan-style Cheongsam

The Beijing-style cheongsam originated in Beijing and is fairly traditional and conservative. It is typically handmade. It maintains the traditional straight and A-line silhouette, and often has embroidery and elaborate adornments. It is also characterized by its wide piping. The Beijing-style cheongsam expresses Chinese culture in its style. The production of a Beijing cheongsam is complex. The pankou fasteners can sometimes take several days to create, typically requiring twenty-six procedures of silk processing to be turning into silk strips which would be appropriate in the making of the fasteners of various patterns by artisans.

The Shanghai-style Cheongsam originated in Shanghai and is a popular and dominant style. The Shanghai-style Cheongsam, especially, conveyed progressive messages of female body emancipation from the 1930s to 1940s; it also came to symbolize the idea of modernity in "pursuing health, fashion, and natural beauty". As a result, to deliberately create a more figure-hugging silhouette and to focus on showing off the natural curve of the female body, many elements of Western tailoring techniques can be found in the Shanghai-style cheongsam, including curved cutting, waist darts. This act of showing the female body was a physical expression of the changes in the identities of Chinese women and their rebellion against the idealized womanhood as indicated in the Confucian ideology. It also features high side slits and high collar. The collars can be lapel collars, water drop collars, and lotus leaf collars; the shape of the sleeves are also diverse. It also uses lighter materials and has less elaborate embroidery or adornments; the piping is very narrow.

The Jiangnan-style cheongsam, also known as Su-style cheongsam, originated in the Jiangnan Water town. This style of cheongsam expresses the cultural characteristics of the water town in Jiangnan and also creates a fusion between Chinese calligraphy and Chinese painting, incorporating the hand-painting art of the Wumen School of Painting. It is characterized by the neckline and embroidered patterns on the edges of the cuff. The dress is also embroidered with rich pattern motifs which tend to be floral, e.g. plum, orchid, bamboo, chrysanthemum, peonies, and roses. The fabrics used tend to be high-quality soft satin and plain crepe satin, etc.

The Cantonese-style cheongsam, also known as the Hong Kong style, the Guangdong style, or simply the cheongsam (長衫), is one of the major regional traditions of the modern qipao, originating in Guangdong. Compared with other schools, it is understated, restrained, and minimalist, a product of Lingnan culture blended with Western aesthetics, and is often described as “the qipao that looks least like a qipao" (最不像旗袍的旗袍). In 2018, the Guangdong Museum also presented the exhibition A Century of Fashion: The Story of the Hong Kong Cheongsam (百年時尚：香港長衫故事). The cheongsam worn by Anita Mui in the Hong Kong film Rouge is a Hong Kong style cheongsam. From the mid‑1950s to the late 1960s, the cheongsam was the most common and respectable form of dress for urban women in Hong Kong. After its decline in the 1970s, there was a period when the cheongsam survived mainly as a uniform—worn by waitresses in traditional Chinese restaurants and by Cathay Pacific flight attendants—while ordinary people no longer wore it in daily life. Around 2016, however, a movement emerged in Hong Kong to revive the cheongsam. Advocates argued that it should be worn according to one’s own taste and personality, without deliberately pursuing the long neck, broad shoulders, narrow waist, and ‘vase‑shaped’ silhouette of the past. Keeping pace with the times, they sought to give the cheongsam new meaning and renewed vitality.

== History ==
=== Background ===
The Manchu are an ethnic minority that founded the last of China's imperial dynasties, the Qing dynasty, which lasted from 1644 to 1911. When the dynasty was first established, dress regulations were implemented as a way of expressing their identity as a people and creating social order. They used an administrative division called the Eight Banner system. Originally only the Manchu households were organized within this system, but over time naturalized Mongols and Han Chinese were incorporated. The Manchu, and anyone living under the Eight Banners system, wore different clothing from ordinary civilians. Thus, they became known as the Banner People (Chinese: 旗人; pinyin: qírén; lit. 'banner person').

The type of qizhuang that both men and women typically wore consisted of long robes, which can be referred to as the Manchu changpao and also categorized under the broad category of changpao (Chinese: 长袍; Chinese: 長袍; lit. 'long robe') or changshan (simplified Chinese: 长衫; traditional Chinese: 長衫; lit. 'long shirt').

Manchu men wore a changpao, which were designed for horseback riding, known as neitao, which was characterized by two pair of slits (one slit on each side, one slit on the back, and one slit on the front) which increased ease of movement when mounting and dismounting horses, a pianjin collar (a collar which curved like the alphabet《S》), and the sleeve cuffs known as matixiu (Chinese: 马蹄袖; pinyin: mǎtíxiù; lit. 'horse hoof cuff').

Manchu changpao of women

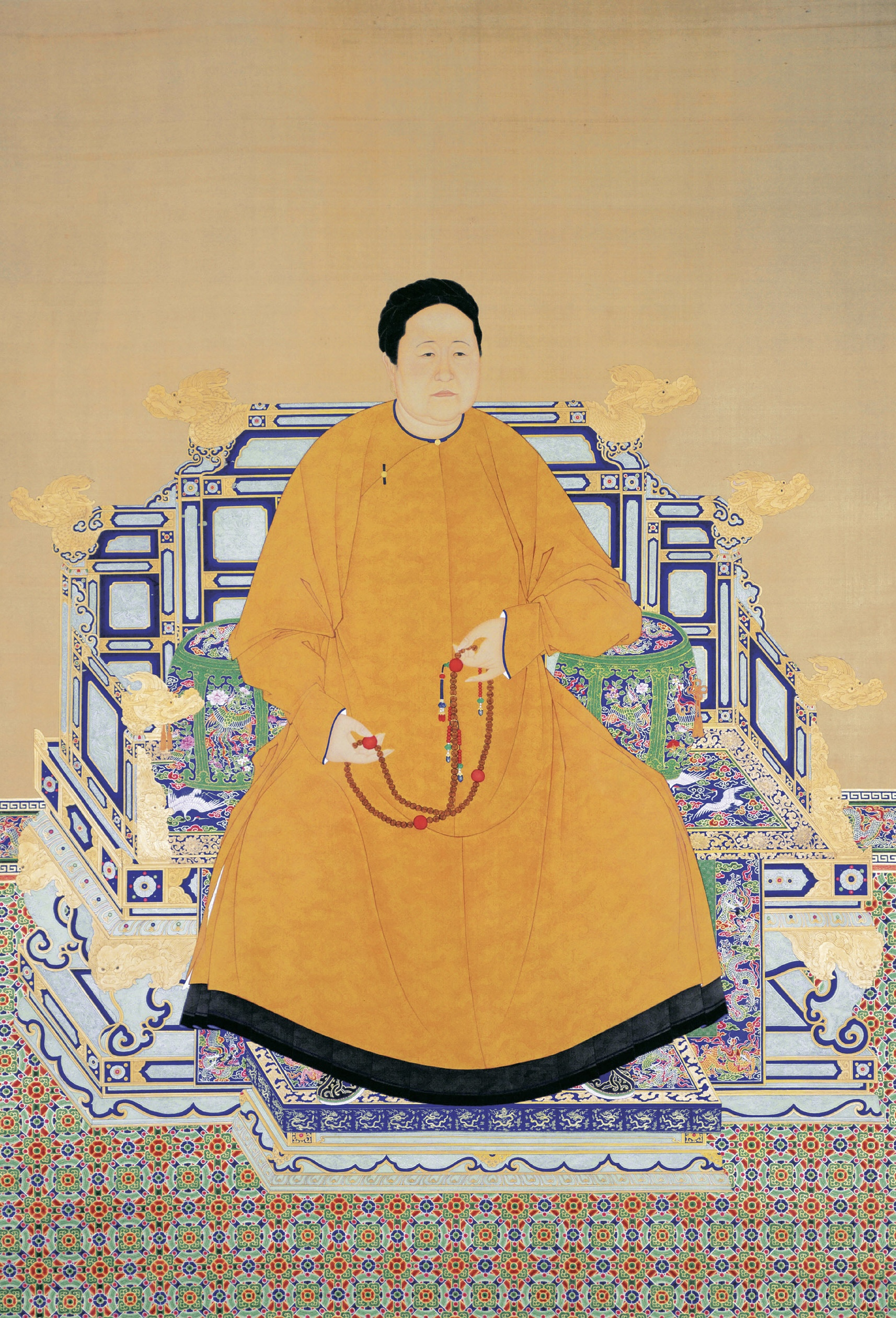
changfupao

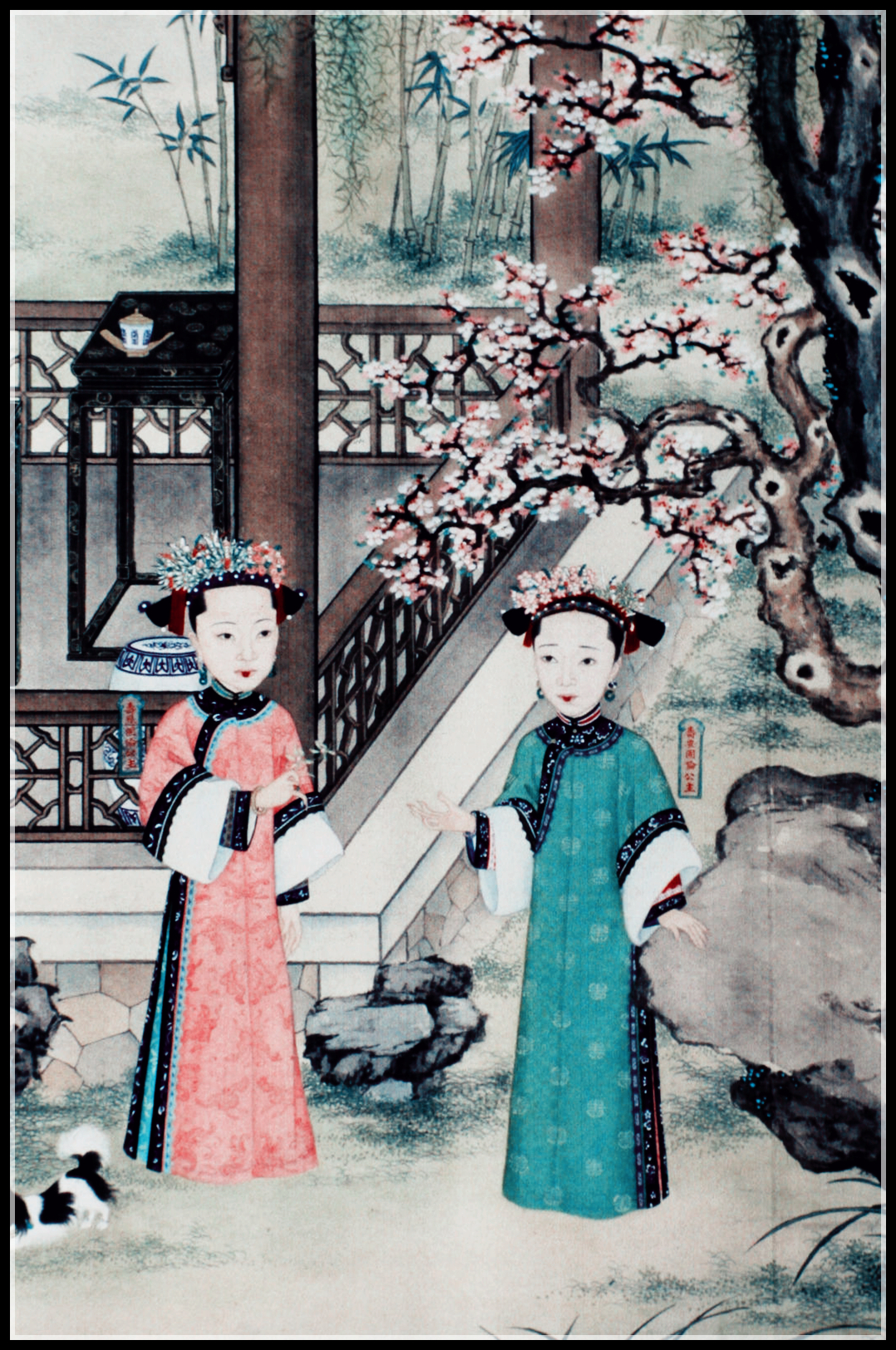
changyi

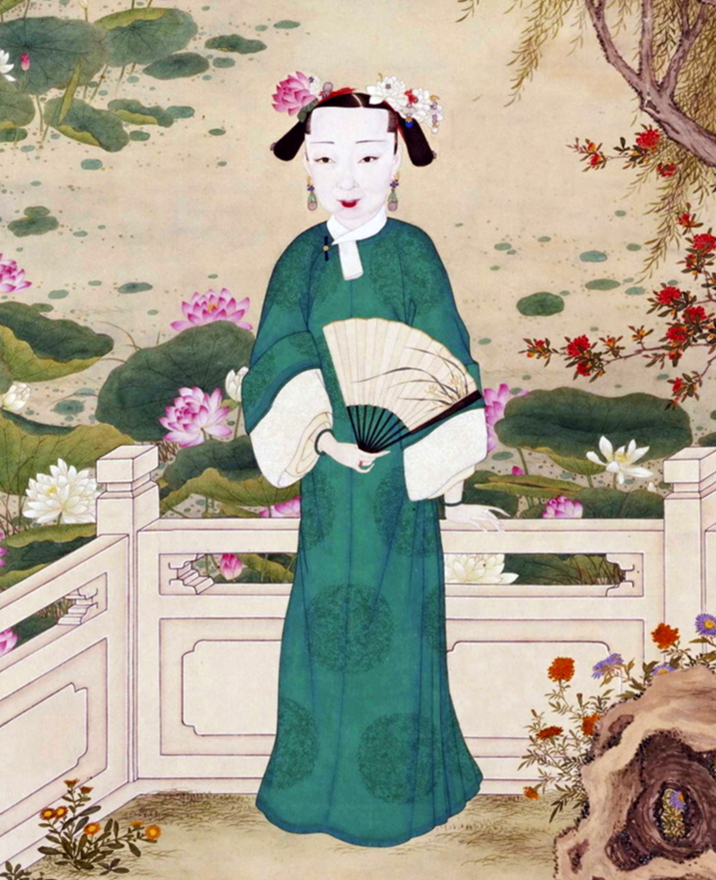
chenyi

On the other hand, some imperial Manchu women wore a changfu (常服), informal dress, which looked similar to the men's neitao known as the changfupao (常服袍). There were also two styles of changpao for the imperial consorts, known as chenyi and changyi, which became popular. The chenyi and the changyi differed in terms of structure: the changyi had two high side slits which allowed for greater ease of movements while the chenyi had no side slits. Both the chenyi and changyi differed from the changfupao lacking the matixiu cuffs. Both the chenyi and changyi were also the changfu of the Manchu women; they also both became popular during the reign of Emperor Qianlong. It is also theorized that the cheongsam was derived from the Manchu women's chenyi although the chenyi shows the absence of slits.

=== Introduction of Manchu-style clothing ===
Chinese changshan and Manchu neitao
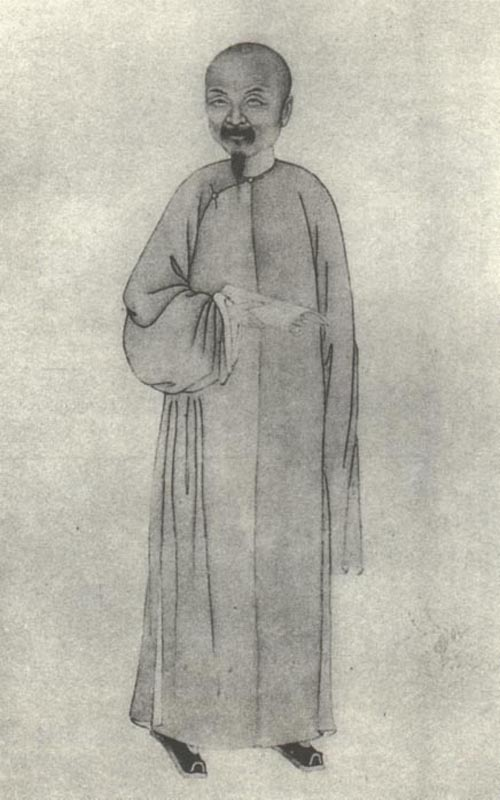
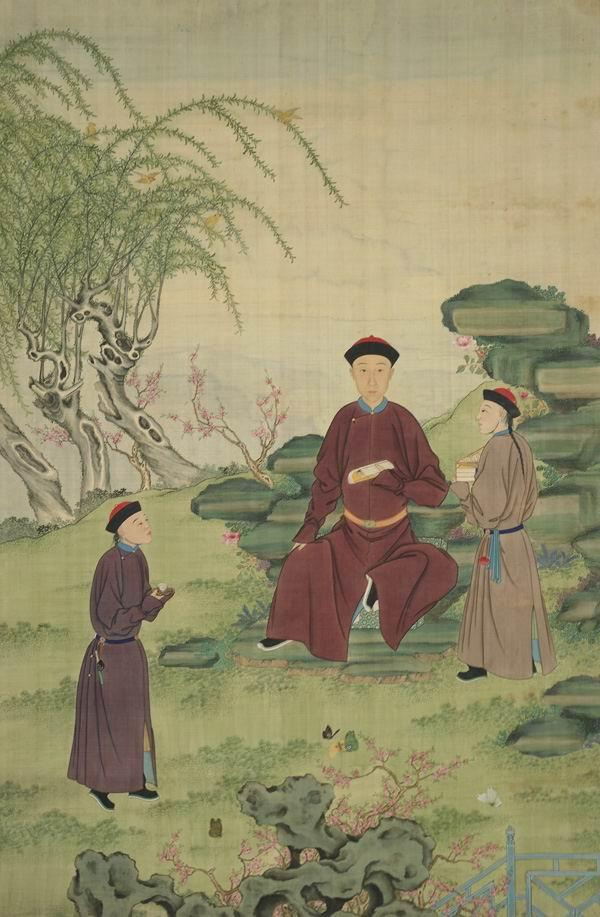
Differences between the Chinese Changshan (left) and Manchu Neitao (right), Qing dynasty

Throughout China's multicultural history, clothing has been shaped through an intermingling of primarily Han clothing styles, the Han Chinese being the dominant ethnicity, and the styles of various ethnic groups. Some examples include the standing collar of the cheongsam, which has been found in relics from the Ming dynasty, ruled by the Han Chinese, and was subsequently adopted in the Qing dynasty as Manchu clothing items. Manchu robes were initially collarless. The Manchu also adopted the right closure from the Han Chinese as they initially closed their robes on the left side.

Han Chinese women's attire and Manchu women's robe

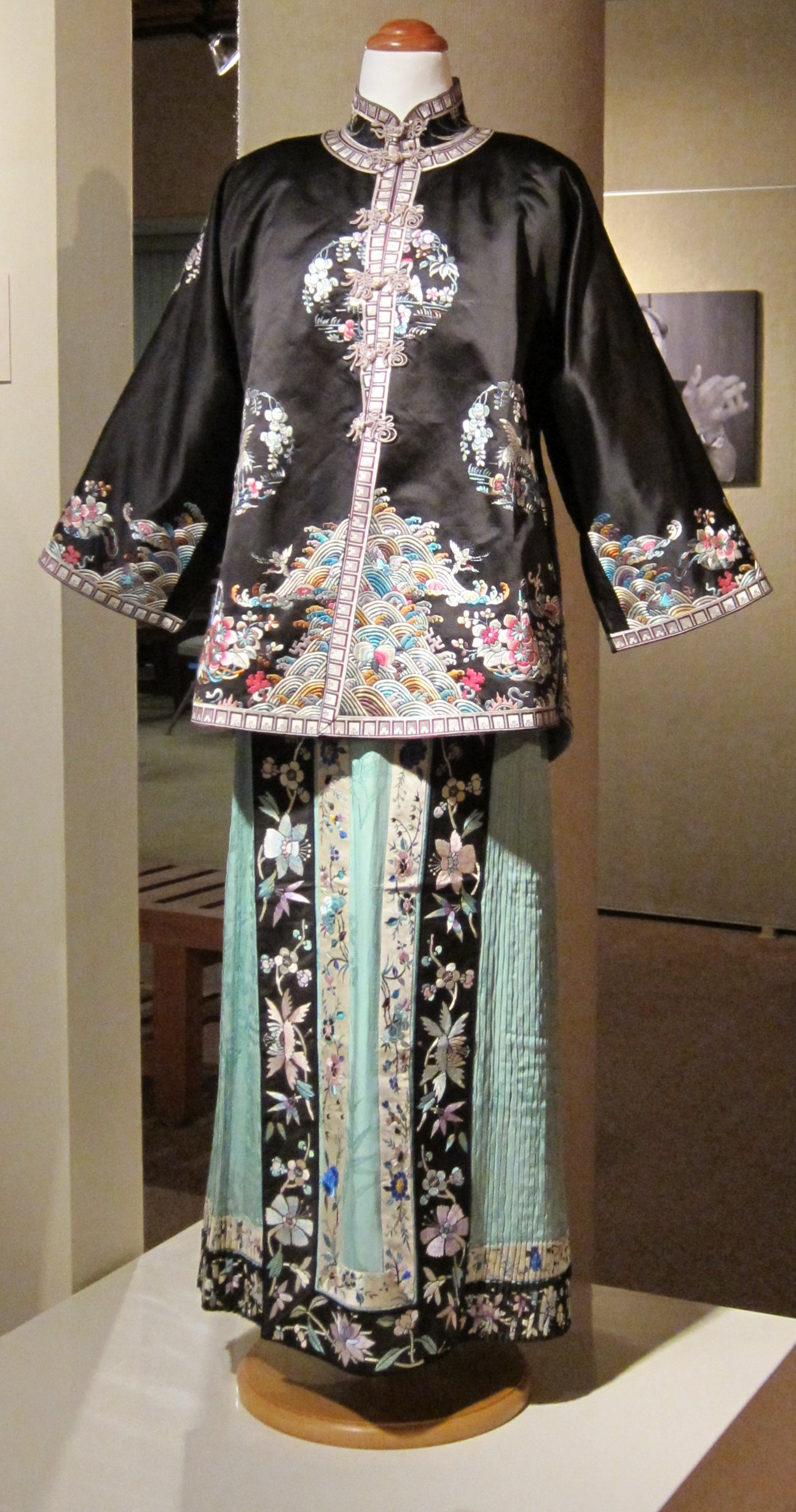
Han Chinese's women aoqun, Qing dynasty

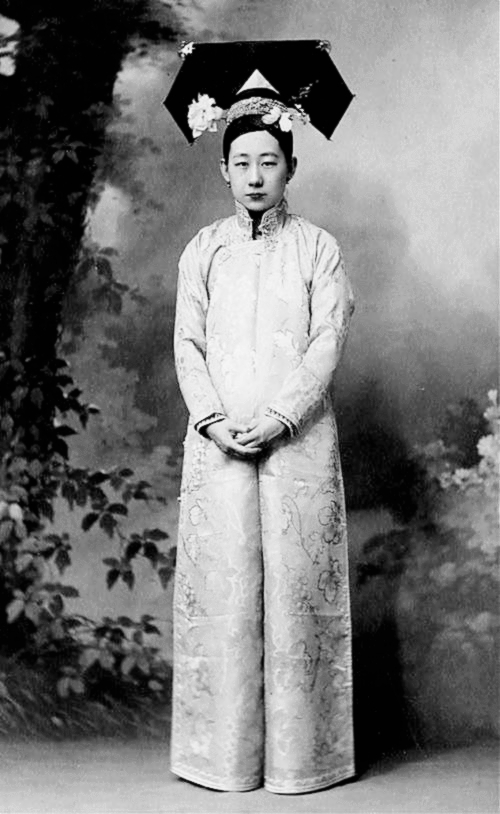
Chenyi, a one-piece Manchu women's robe, Qing dynasty.

Left: A Qing-style aoqun, a form of Hanfu worn by Han women around the 19th to 20th centuries. Below their upper garment, this qun, skirt, is a mamianqun, a style which was inherited from the Ming dynasty and continued to develop in the Qing dynasty. Right: Lady Aisin-Gioro Hengxiang, the birth mother of Wanrong, wearing the traditional Manchu one-piece robe, a chenyi, that later inspired the cheongsam.

Under the dynastic laws of transition from Ming to Qing, all Han Chinese were forced to adopt the Manchu male queue hairstyle and adopt Manchu clothing under the Tifayifu (剃发易服; 剃髮易服; tìfàyìfú) policy instead of being found wearing the traditional Hanfu, under the threat of death penalty. However, the order for ordinary non-Banner Han civilians to wear Manchu clothing was lifted, and only those Han who served as officials or scholars were required to wear them. Over time though, some Han civilian men voluntarily adopted the changshan. By the late Qing, not only officials and scholars, but a great many Han commoners wore Manchu-style male attire. However, until 1911, the Manchu changpao was required clothing for Chinese men of a certain class.

What is now known as the Chinese changshan was developed by the Han Chinese during the Qing dynasty. Han Chinese started to wear the Qing dynasty Chinese changshan after the Manchu conquest; the Chinese changshan was a modified version of the daopao or zhiduo worn in the Ming dynasty (1368–1644 AD), the dynasty preceding the Qing dynasty. The Qing dynasty Chinese changshan was modeled after the Manchu's men's robe. It thus adopted certain Manchu elements, such as slimming their changshan, adopting the pianjin collar of the Manchu, and using buttons and loops at the neck and sides. The Chinese changshan differed from the Manchu men's neitao as it only had two slits on the sides, lacking the central front and back slits, and lacked the presence of the matixiu cuffs; the sleeves were also longer than the ones found in the neitao.

For women, Manchu and Han systems of clothing coexisted. Throughout the Qing dynasty, Han civilian women could wear traditional Han clothing from the Ming dynasty. As a result, Ming dynasty style clothing was preserved to an extent in China until the Xinhai Revolution of 1911.

=== Birth of the cheongsam ===
In the late 1910s, after the overthrow of the Qing dynasty and the founding of the Republic of China, women began to partake in the education system. They wore an early form of the cheongsam, which quickly became the regular outfit of urban women in metropolitan cities like Beijing and Shanghai. Cheongsam of the late 1910s and early 1920s had relatively loose cutting with long, wide sleeves. One of the earliest cheongsams was A-line with wide three-quarter sleeves and would fall just below the knee level.

Under the Western influences of wearing shorter dresses in 1928, the length of the cheongsam became shorter. In 1929, the cheongsam was chosen by the Republic of China government to be one of the country's national dresses. With the designation of "national dress", the Republic of China government also promulgated the new Clothing Regulations of 1929, which specified the cheongsam should be worn with trousers and be calf-length. However, even before the Clothing Regulations of 1929, women had already stopped wearing ku trousers in favor of silk stockings. Chinese women held no respect to the rule, as it was seen as an attempt by the Republican government to control individual rights and woman's liberty.

From the 1920s onwards, the cheongsam was quickly popularized by celebrities, socialites, and politicians in Shanghai. Former First Lady of China Madame Wellington Koo (Oei Hui-lan) was a prominent figure among them. Voted several times by Vogue into its lists of the world's best-dressed women, Madame Wellington Koo was much admired for her adaptations of the traditional Manchu fashion, which she wore with lace trousers and jade necklaces. Cheongsam dresses at the time had been decorously slit a few inches up the sides, but Madame Koo slashed hers to the knee, 'with lace pantelettes just visible to the ankle'. Unlike other Asian socialites, Madame Koo also insisted on local Chinese silks, which she thought were of superior quality.

=== Further transformation ===
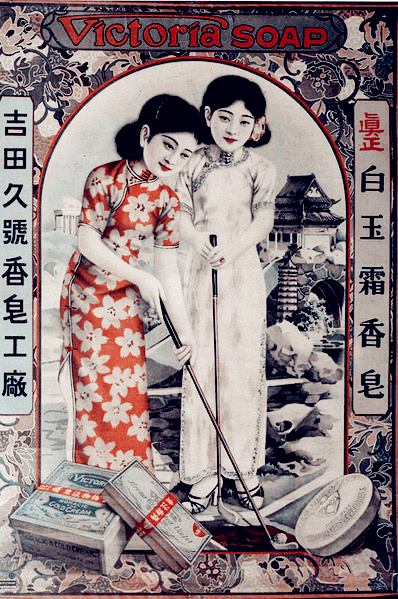
Two women wearing cheongsam and high-heel shoes in a 1920s-1930s Shanghai advertisement

Starting from the early 1920s-1930s, there was a further transformation of the qipao as it became increasingly shorter, tighter, and body-hugging, with side slits that reached up to the thigh. Moreover, numerous distinct cheongsams designs emerged, with experimental changes on fastenings, pipings, collars, fur-lined cuffs, various length of sleeves, or simply sleeveless.

Consumer culture rose as Western and Chinese merchants cooperated to move towards early capitalism. People eagerly sought a more modernized dress style and transformed the old cheongsam to suit new tastes. Newer forms featured slender and tight-fitting pencil cuts and deep necks, which is different from the early cheongsam. High-class courtesans and celebrities in the city welcomed the tight-fitting cheongsam. It was at this time the word cheongsam became well known in English. In Shanghainese, it was first known as zansae for 'long dress', rendered in Mandarin as chángshān and in Cantonese as chèuhngsāam. Then, the spoken Cantonese renditions of 長衫 was borrowed into English as "cheongsam".

Trousers had completely fallen out of use, replaced by different types of hosiery. High-heeled shoes were popularized in the Shanghai fashion scene in the 1920s-1930s. Stockings and High-heeled shoes became an essential part of the cheongsam fashion set, which spawned new side slits designs reaching the hip line, intended to display the hosiery and heels. As Western fashions evolved, so did the cheongsam design, introducing high-necked sleeveless dresses, bell-like sleeves, and the black lace frothing at the hem of a ball gown. By the 1940s, cheongsam came in a wide variety of fabrics with an equal variety of accessories.

=== In late 20th century ===
Cheongsams were worn by celebrities, societies, and students of prestigious missionary schools in the early 20th century. As a result, the cheongsam-style uniform was regarded as an icon of the wealthy class and was perceived as Bourgeois by the Communist China. From the 1950s to the 1970s, with the destroying Four Olds movements and the Chinese Cultural Revolution (1966–1976), China pushed for egalitarian ideology and wearing cheongsam could result in punishment. For example, in 1963, when Chinese President Liu Shaoqi visited four neighbouring countries in South Asia, the first lady Wang Guangmei wore a cheongsam. She was later declared guilty in the Cultural Revolution for wearing it, due to its historical ties and symbolism.

In other Chinese communities, such as Taiwan, Malaysia, Indonesia, Singapore and Hong Kong, the cheongsam remained popular after the war. It became everyday wear in the British colony of Hong Kong in the 1950s, and leather clutch, high heels, and white gloves were common pairing accessories. However, the popularity ultimately declined in the 1970s, giving way for cheaper and mass-produced Western-style clothing.

Since the 1980s, with the trend of reevaluation of Chinese traditional culture, people in mainland China started to pay attention to the cheongsam again. The cheongsam is gaining popularity in films, beauty pageants, and fashion shows in both China and other countries all over the world. In 1984, the cheongsam was specified as the formal attire of female diplomatic agents by the People's Republic of China.

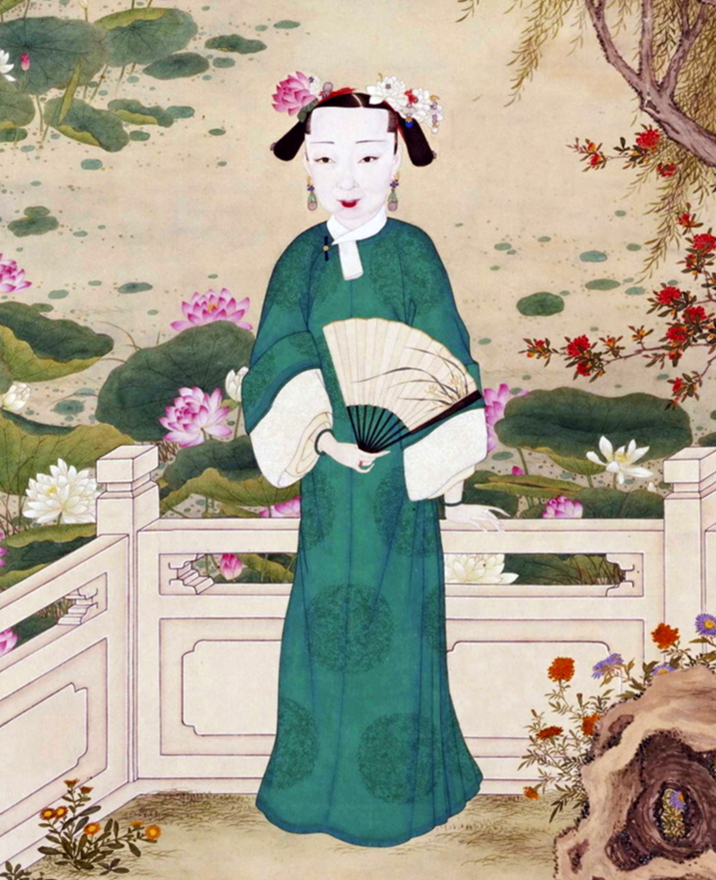
Daoguang Period
(1821–1850)
Empress Xiaoshen

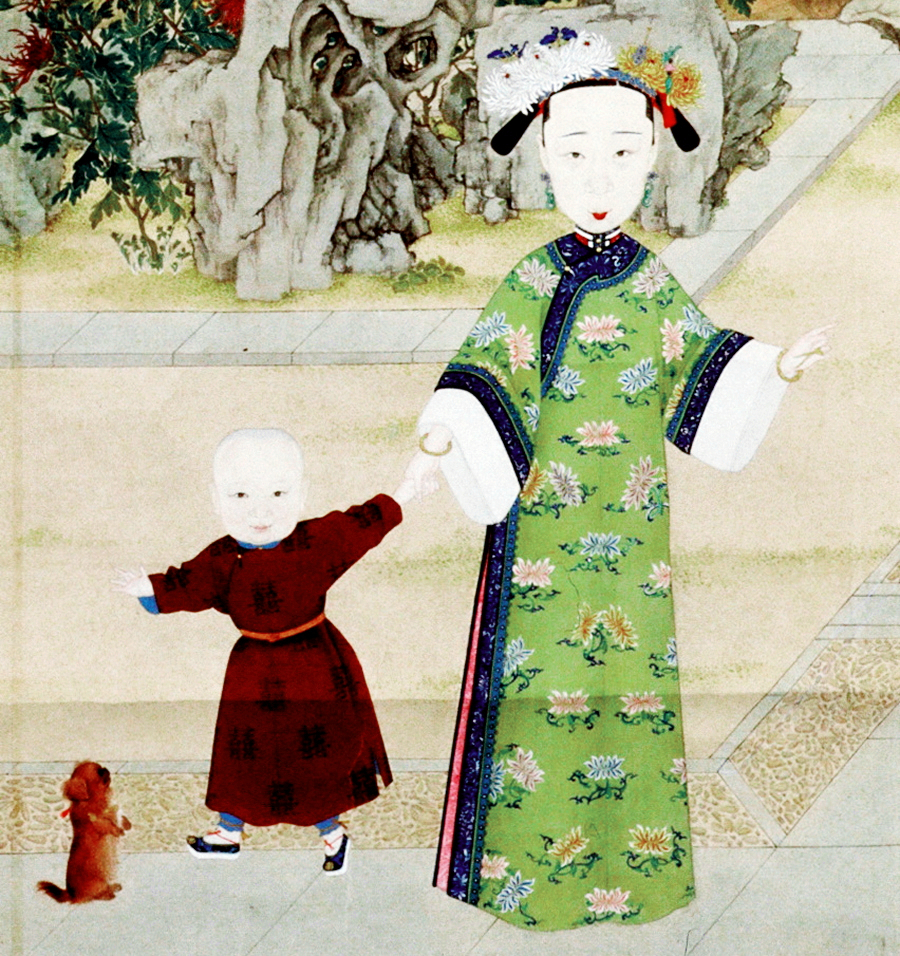
Daoguang Period
(1821–1850)
Empress Xiaojingcheng

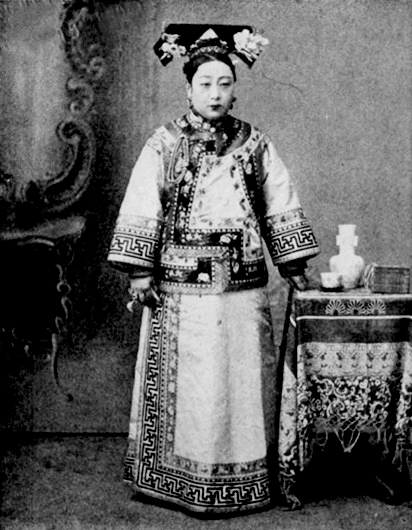
Guangxu Period
(1875–1908)
Lady Heseri

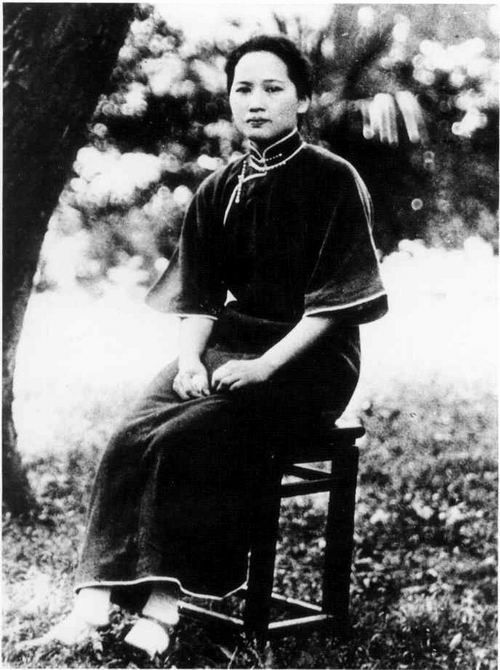
Republican Period
(1912–1949)
Soong Ching-ling 1925

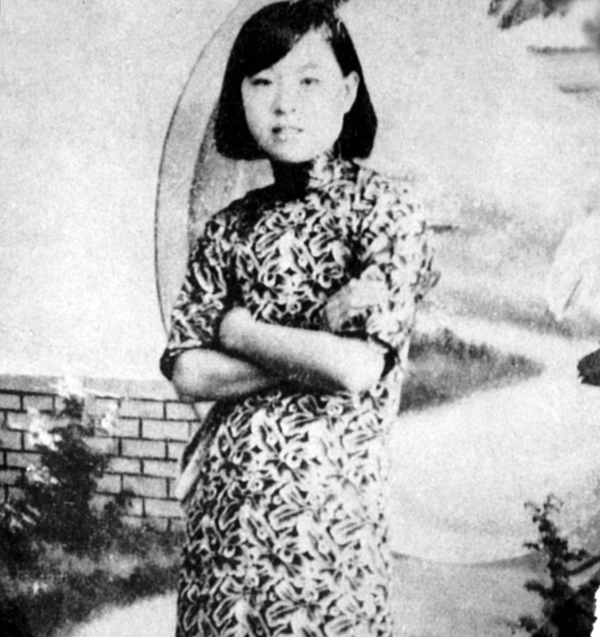
Republican Period
(1912–1949)
Noble Consort Mingxian 1937

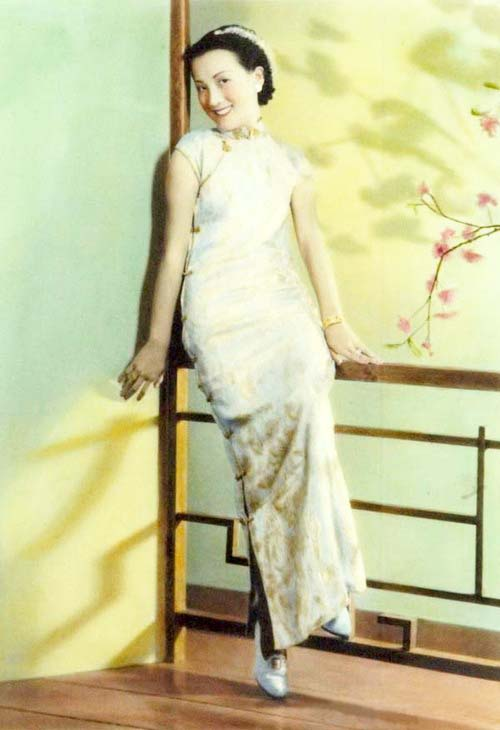
Republican Period
(1912–1949)
Actress Zhou Xuan late 1930s

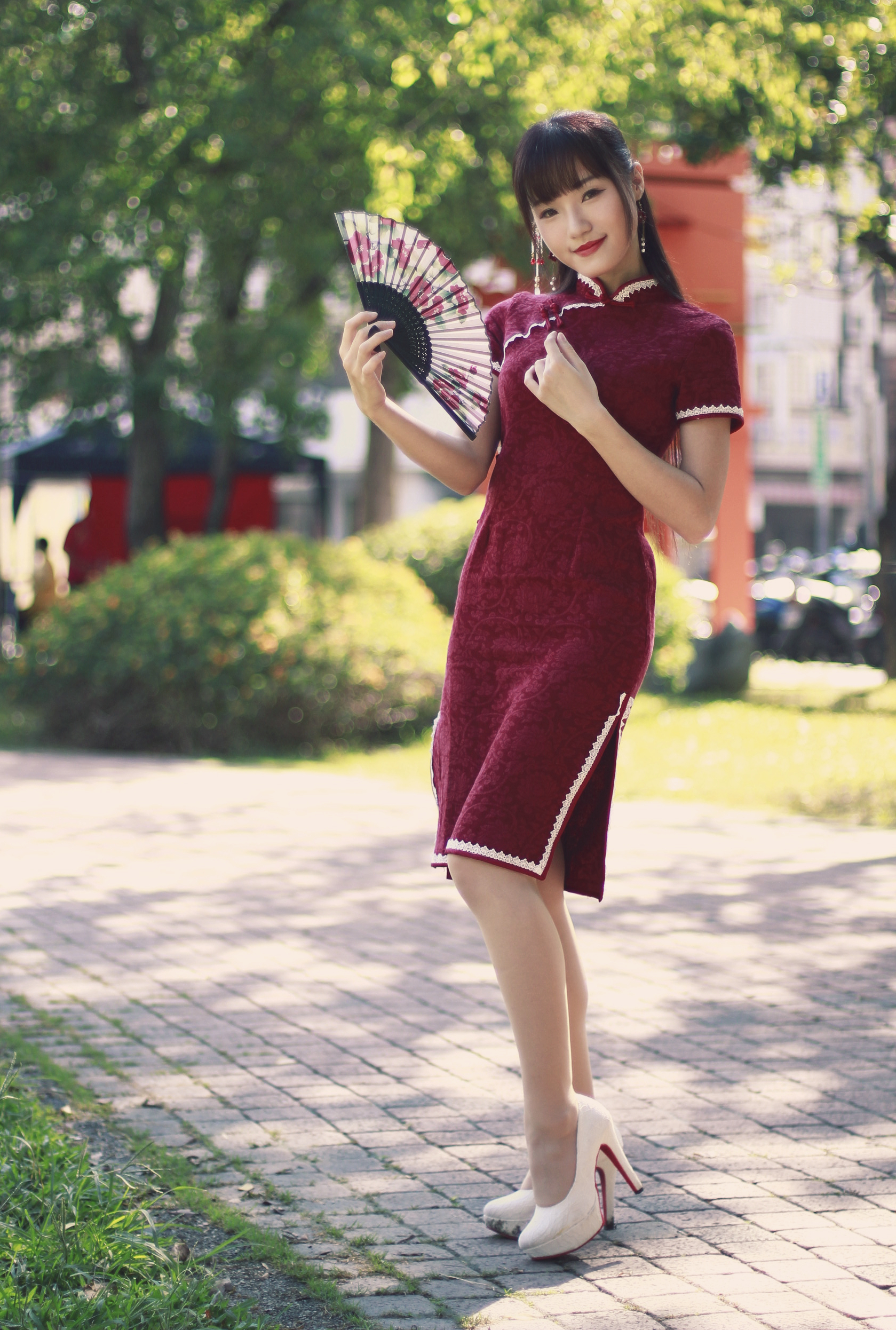
Post-War Period
(1949-)
Modern Qipao 2016

== Modern use ==
=== Workplace ===
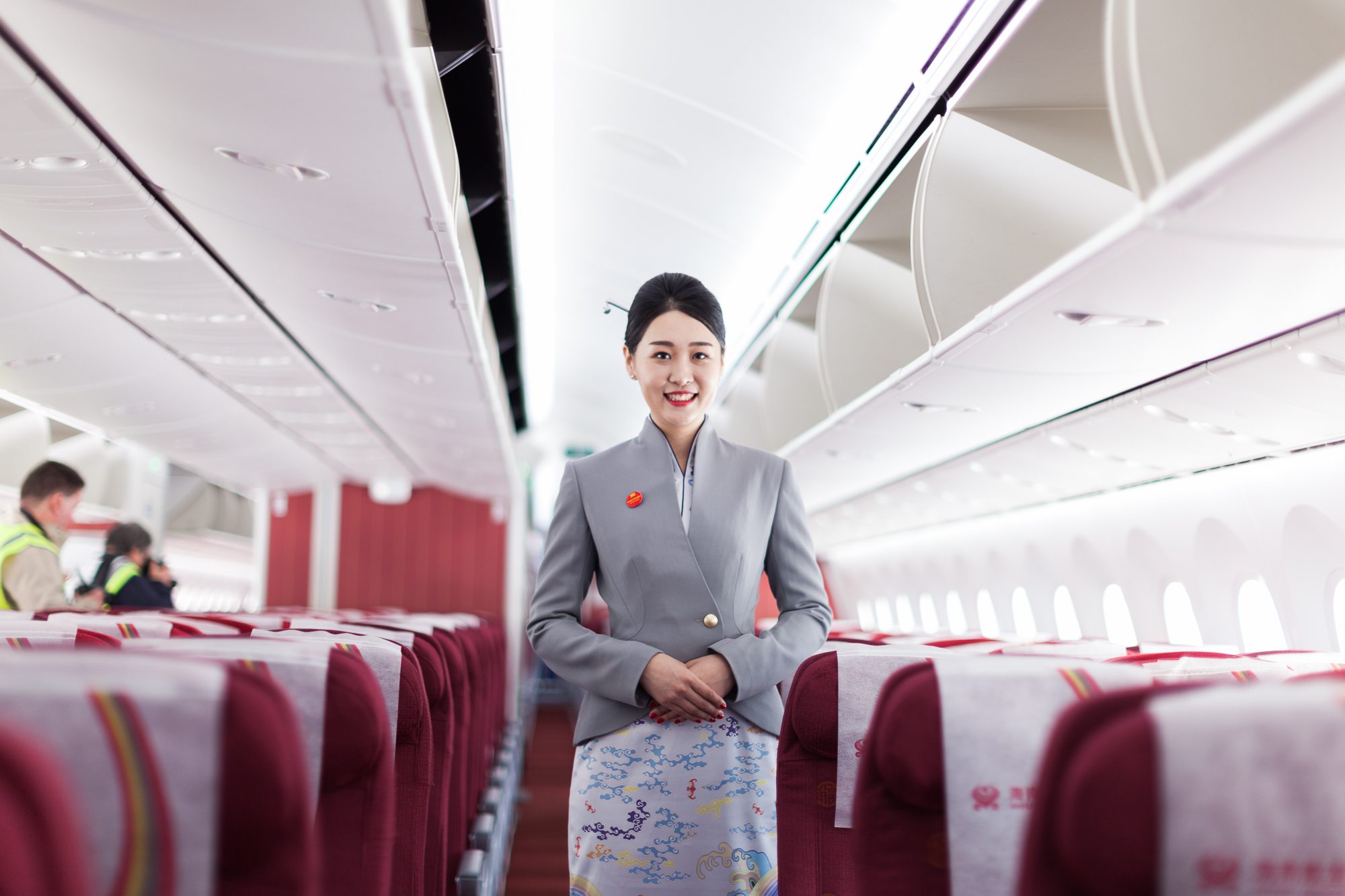
The uniform of Hainan Airlines cabin attendants based on cheongsam debuted in 2017, with a coat worn outside.

Some airlines in mainland China and Taiwan, such as China Airlines and Hainan Airlines, have cheongsam uniforms for their women flight attendants and ground workers. These uniform cheongsams are in a plain color, hemmed just above the knee, with a close-fitting wool suit jacket of the same color as the cheongsam. It is also common for these uniforms to only borrow certain elements, such as the standing collar and frog clasps, without adopting the whole design. In the 1950s, women in the workforce in Hong Kong started to wear more functional cheongsam made of wool, twill, and other materials. Most were tailor fitted and often came with a matching jacket. The dresses were a fusion of Chinese tradition with modern styles. Cheongsam was commonly replaced by more comfortable clothing such as sweaters, jeans, business suits, and skirts. Due to its restrictive nature, it is now mainly worn as formal wear for important occasions. They are sometimes worn by politicians and film artists in Taiwan and Hong Kong. They are shown in some Chinese movies, such as in the 1960s film The World of Suzie Wong, where actress Nancy Kwan made the cheongsam briefly fashionable in Western culture. They are also commonly seen in beauty contests, along with swimsuits. Today, cheongsam is only commonly worn day to day as a uniform by people like restaurant hostesses and serving staff at luxury hotels.

=== School uniform ===
Before World War II, it was customary for girl students who attended schools run by Western missionaries societies to wear cheongsam as their school uniforms; on the other hand, there were very few indigenous Chinese schools that were using the cheongsam as a school uniform.

A few primary schools and some secondary schools in Hong Kong, especially older schools established by Christian missionaries, use a plain-rimmed sky-blue cotton and/or dark blue velvet (for winter) cheongsam with the metal school badge right under the stand-up collar to be closed with a metal hook and eye as the official uniform for their female students. The schools which use this standard include True Light Girls' College, St. Paul's Co-educational College, Heep Yunn School, St. Stephen's Girls' College, Ying Wa Girls' School, etc. These cheongsams are usually straight, with no waist shaping, and the cheongsam hem must reach mid-thigh. The cheongsam fit closely to the neck, and the stiff collar is hooked closed, despite the tropical humid and hot weather. Although the skirts have short slits, they are too narrow to allow students to walk in long strides. The seams above the slits often split when walking and are repeatedly sewn. Many schools also require underskirts to be worn with the cheongsam. The underskirt is a white cotton full slip, hemmed slightly shorter than the cheongsam, and has slits at the sides like the cheongsam, although the slits are deeper. A white cotton undershirt is often worn underneath the cheongsam. The cheongsam's length, styling, color, and sleeve length vary between schools. Many students feel it is an ordeal, yet it is a visible manifestation of the strict discipline that is the hallmark of prestigious secondary schools in Hong Kong, and many students and their parents like that. Some rebellious students express dissatisfaction with this tradition by wearing their uniform with the stand-up collar intentionally left unhooked or hemmed above their knees. The Ying Wa and True Light Schools have sent questionnaires to their students about uniform reforms but have not altered their policies. However, Madam Lau Kam Lung Secondary School of Miu Fat Buddhist Monastery ended their cheongsam uniform in 1990 after receiving suggestions from its student union.

=== Festivities ===
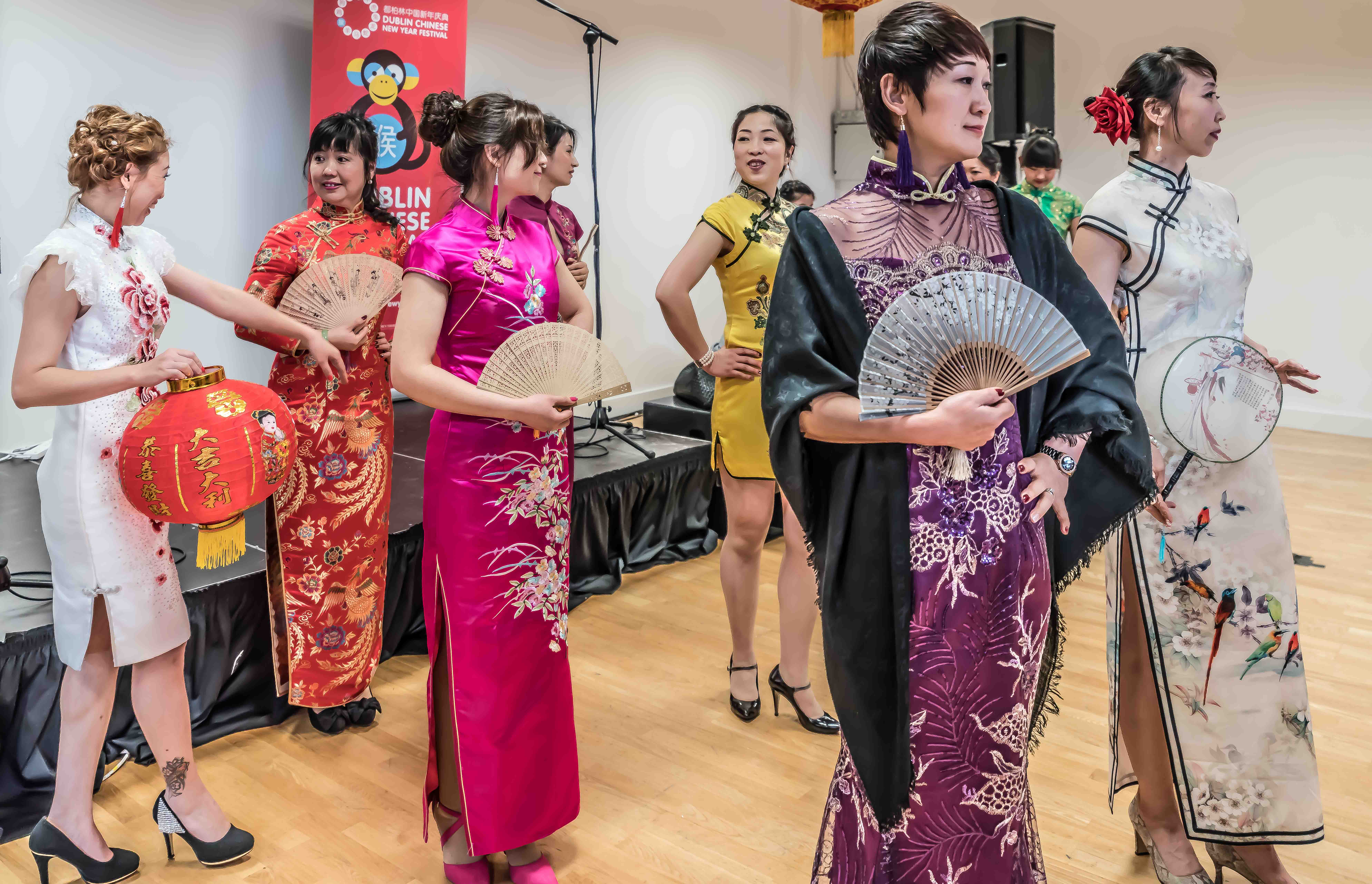
Women in Dublin Chinese community celebrating Chinese New Year in various styles of Qipao, 2016

Cheongsams are a popular outfit choice for festive seasons like Chinese New Year. In countries with significant Chinese populations, such as Malaysia, Singapore, Hong Kong, and Taiwan, it is common for women to have new cheongsams tailored in preparation for the New Year. Cheongsams are also popular outfits for older women on formal occasions or family reunions. Upmarket fashion labels such as Shanghai Tang specialize in modern versions of the cheongsam as occasion wear.

=== Weddings ===
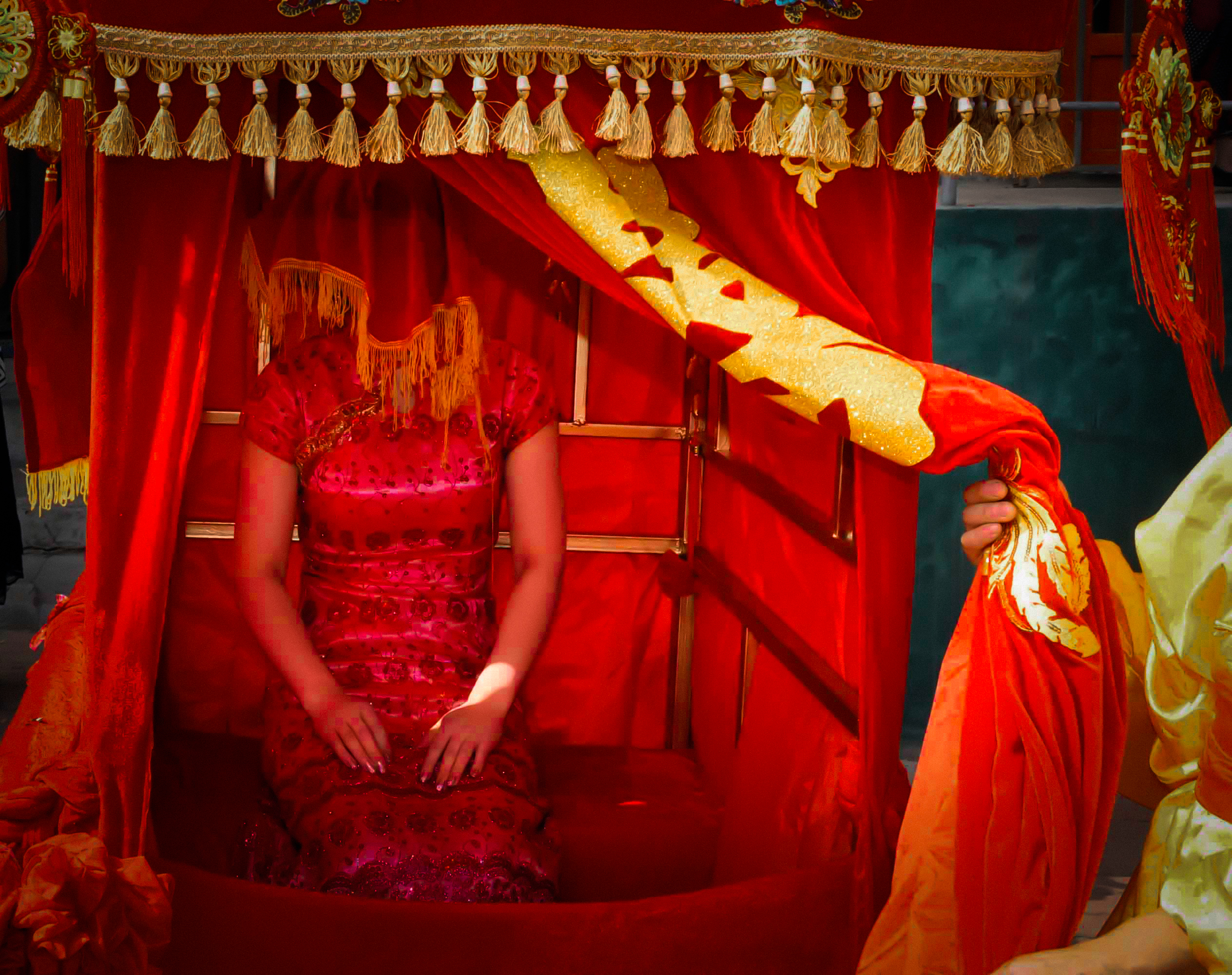
A bride wearing a red wedding cheongsam covering her face with a honggaitou (a red veil).

In Western weddings, Chinese brides or brides marrying into a Chinese family will often wear cheongsam for a portion of the wedding day. It is common for many brides to have both a traditional white wedding dress and a cheongsam or a qungua (another kind of wedding attire) to be worn during the tea ceremony. Cheongsam styles have also evolved to be more modern, from mermaid silhouettes to semi-traditional styles that feature a cheongsam top with softer details like lace and a looser skirt.

=== Lolita fashion ===
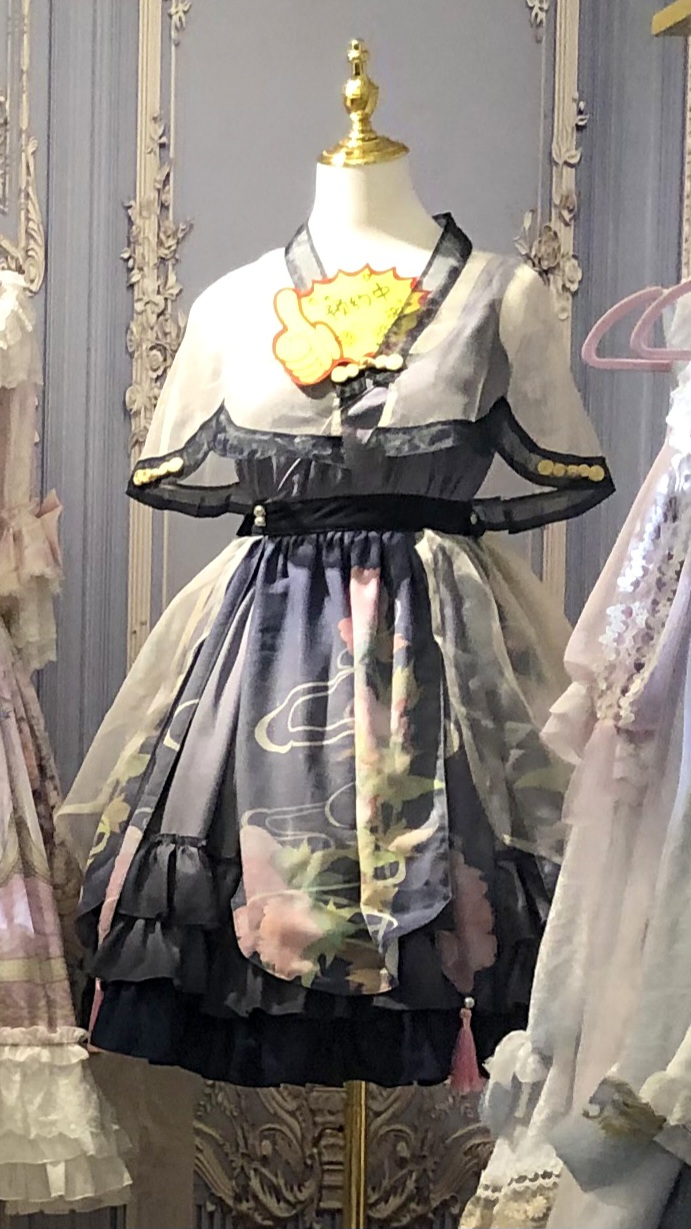
Dark blue Qi Lolita dress without mandarin collar.

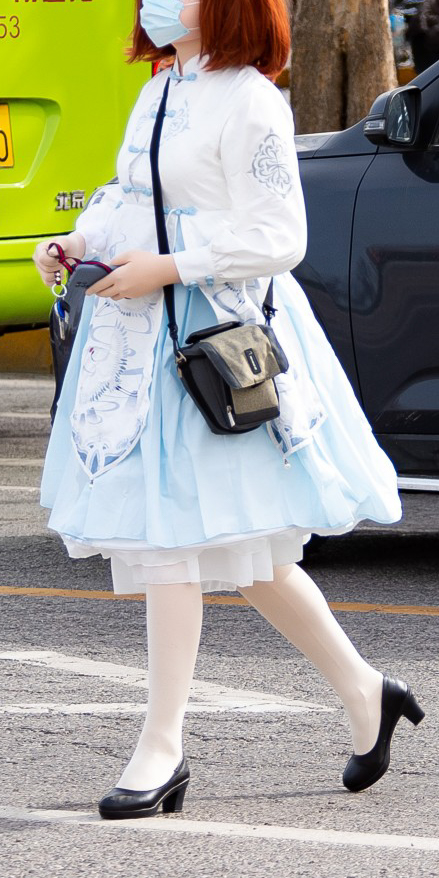
Light blue Qi Lolita dress with mandarin collar.

Some Lolita dresses are styled like cheongsam. The dresses or jumper skirts are designed after traditional Chinese dresses. This style of Lolita fashion is called Qi Lolita.

== On the international stage ==
=== Sport-related ===
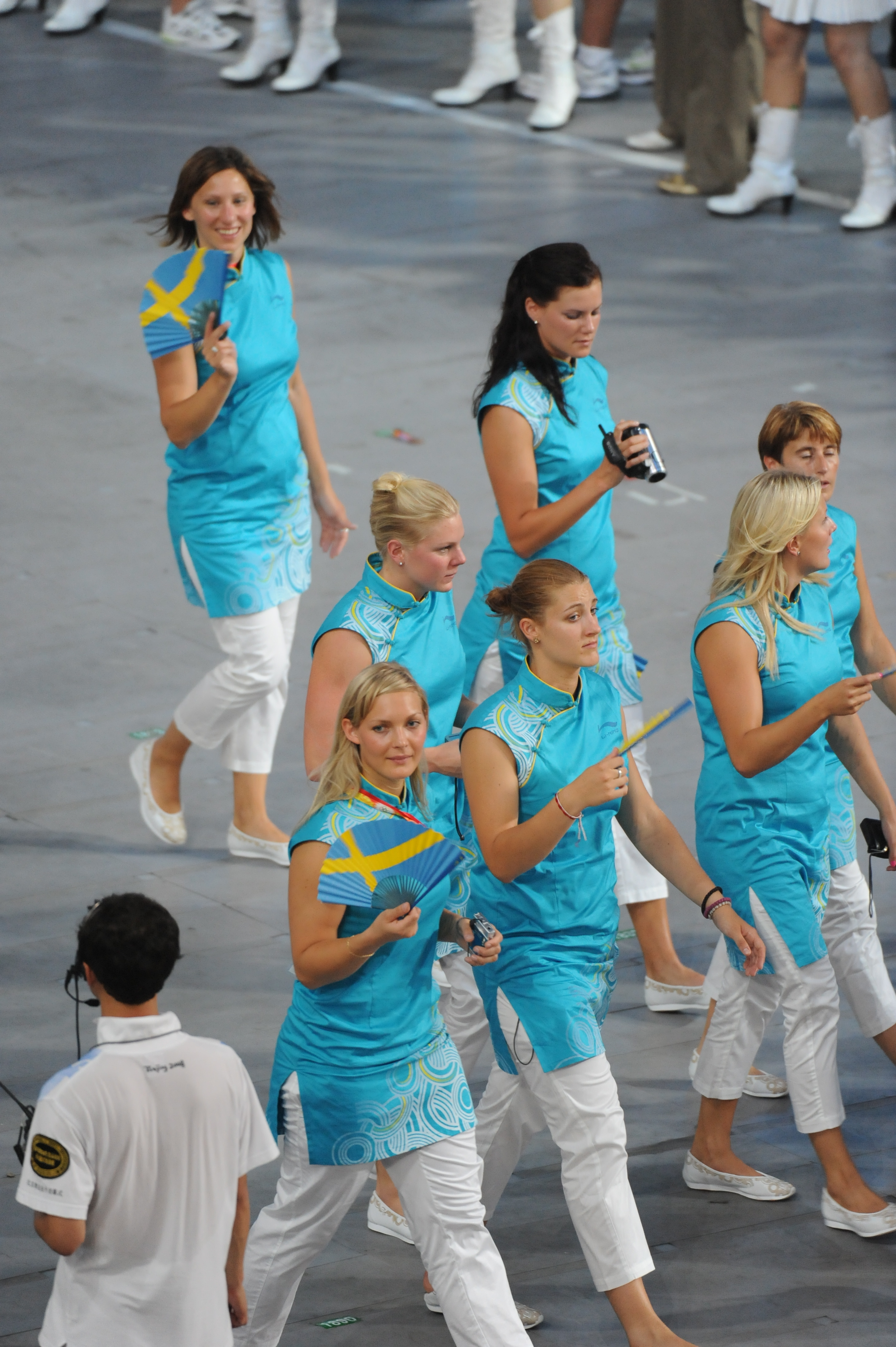
The Swedish team wearing cheongsam at the 2008 Olympics.

In the 2008 Summer Olympics, the medal bearers wore cheongsam. Similar attire was worn by female members of the Swedish team and of the Spanish team in the opening ceremony, with the national colors.

For the 2012 Hong Kong Sevens tournament, sportswear brand Kukri Sports teamed up with Hong Kong lifestyle retail store G.O.D. to produce merchandising, which included traditional Chinese jackets and cheongsam-inspired ladies' polo shirts.

=== Political stage ===
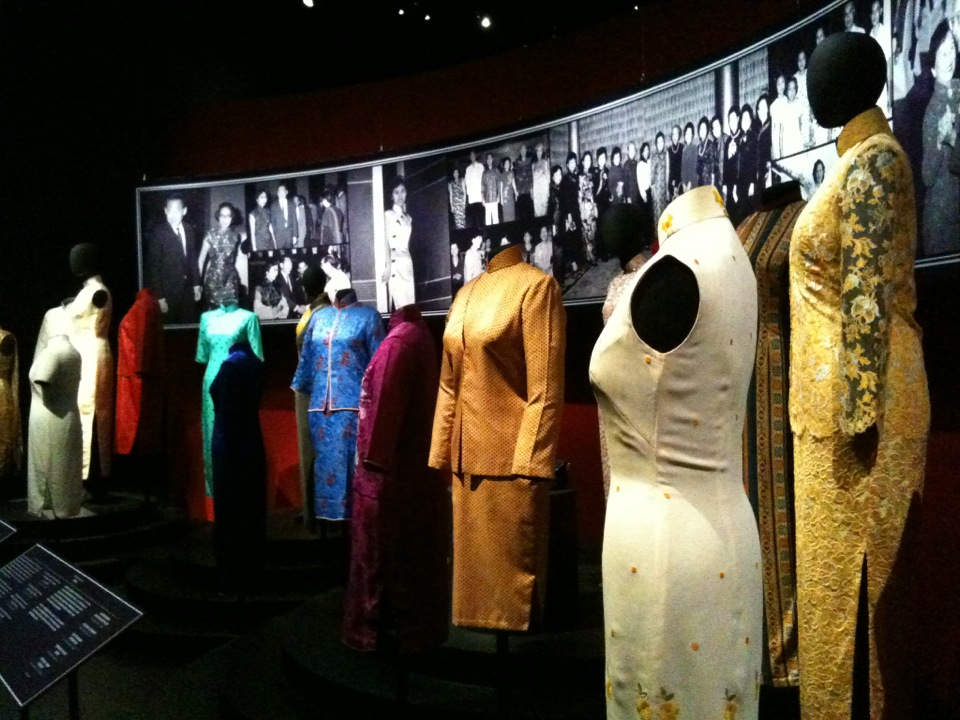
Cheongsam belonging to the wives of past Singaporean political leaders on display in an exhibition entitled In the Mood for Cheongsam: Modernity and Singapore Women at the National Museum of Singapore in 2012

In contemporary China, the meaning of cheongsam has been revisited again. It now embodies an identity of being ethnic Chinese and thus is used for important diplomatic occasions.

Since 2013, Peng Liyuan, the first lady of China, has worn cheongsam several times while on foreign visits with Chinese leader Xi Jinping.

In November 2014, cheongsam was the official attire for the political leaders' wives in the 22nd APEC meeting in Beijing.

=== International fashion ===
With the growth of the Chinese economy, cheongsam has experienced a renewed popularity. Many Western designers have integrated elements of cheongsam into their fashion collections. French designer Pierre Cardin once said that cheongsam was his inspiration for many of his evening dress designs. In many films and movies, cheongsam is used to make a fashion statement. The varied interpretations of this ethnic dress brings in debates of cultural appropriation and the designs being linked to Orientalism. In the 2011 movie One Day, Anne Hathaway wore a set of dark blue cheongsam as an evening dress. Many western stars such as Elizabeth Taylor, Grace Kelly, Nicole Kidman, Paris Hilton, Emma Watson, and Celine Dion have also made public appearances wearing cheongsam. This dress style has also been specifically seen on more than one celebrity or figure in the early 2000's. This era is often described as a "global mash up", incorporating styles, silhouettes, prints, and accessories from subcultures around the world. And with this, the qipao made a frequent appearance on the runways and in the closets from the early 2000s. In the 1998, family comedy The Parent Trap, Lindsey Lohan's 11 year old character has a prominent scene wearing a pink qipao, paired with a little matching fluffy pink trimmed purse, also an iconic Y2k accessory.

Whilst Asian fashion has been gaining recognition overseas in western media, it has also caused accusations of insensitive representation of these fashions, also known as Cultural appropriation. For example, the Cheongsam was also available in some US stores as a Halloween costume, causing some controversy. Some have argued that cultural dress is not appreciated when it is sold as a costume. However, as social awareness towards cultural appropriation increases, the availability of these costumes have become rarer.

== Cultural and historical significance ==
The cheongsam became a national dress of the Republic of China, along with the aoqun, a traditional clothing attire of the Han Chinese women. It was eventually accepted by the People's Republic of China as a form of hanfu, thus becoming transnational and representative of a generic Chinese national identity rather than an ethnic or ancestral identity.

The cheongsam can be worn by people of all ages and at any season. It is also used as a style Traditional Chinese wedding dress among many others. For overseas Chinese, the cheongsam has often used as a form of emblematic culture.

In the 1920s, the cheongsam was originally an embodiment of Chinese women's rebellion and a heroic gesture and a marker of Chinese feminism and Chinese women's emancipation.

=== Roles in Chinese nationalism and women's liberation ===
The Republican period is the golden age of the cheongsam. In exploring the reasons behind its prevalence in Republic of China, many scholars relate it to the women's liberation movements. After the feudal Qing dynasty was overturned, Chinese feminists called for women's liberation from traditional roles. They led several movements against the Neo-Confucian gender segregation, including the termination of foot binding for women, cutting off long hair, which was conventionally symbolized as women's "oriental" beauty, and encouraging women to wear men's one-piece clothing, Changshan or "changpao".

"Changpao" was traditionally taken as men's patent throughout the long history from Han dynasty (202 BC to 220) to Qing dynasty (1616–1911). During that time, Chinese Han female's clothing gradually developed into two pieces. Women were forbidden to wear robes as men did and instead had to wear tops and bottoms known as "Liang jie yi". After the Xinhai Revolution of 1911 (which overthrew the Qing dynasty), young Chinese people began to learn Western science and cultures in order to seek a way of saving the nation. Also, the opening of several ports and ceding territories of China to Western powers imported some Western ideas to mainland China. Among all these Western thoughts, the idea of gender equality quickly gained its followers, among whom young female students became its prime advocates.

It was the May Thirteenth Movement of 1925, where anti-Westernization demonstrations persisted throughout the country, that served as an important push for the qipao's institutionalization. The Republicans declared the qipao a formal dress in the Clothing Regulations of 1929. The dress was meant to assert the importance of nationalism by rejecting Western forms of dress. That being said, there were still strict rules regulating how the dress needed to be worn, including specifications about length, material, accessories, collar, buttons, and sleeves, but none of these were followed.

From the start, there was no unifying style for the dress like the Republicans intended; Chinese women had no respect for the Clothing Regulations of 1929, which tried to control individuality. There were endless variations in style, with adaptations to length, material, hemlines, collars, fabrics, patterns, colors, and pairing accessories. It was worn by everyone from Shanghai socialites to students, housewives, and prostitutes. The style of the qipao was often in tune with fashion cycles and was influenced by Western trends seen through women styling it with matching scarves, fur coats, and leather heels. Magazines such as LingLong also gave women access to dressmaking knowledge and normalized it for women to make their dresses in their style. The base form of the qipao is rather simple to sew, which makes it easily accessible and economical.

The style of cheongsam also varied due to Western influence. It changed from a wide and loose style to a more form-fitting and revealing cut, which put more emphasis on women's body lines. The length of the cheongsam was also reduced from the ankle reaching to above the knee.

The design of the cheongsam got various inventions like ruffled collars, bell-like sleeves, and black lace frothing. Starting from that, the priority of cheongsam moved from a political expression to an aesthetic and ornamental emphasis.

=== Intangible cultural heritage ===
Due to its long history dating back to the Manchu clothing of the early Qing dynasty, the Beijing-style cheongsam-making technique is listed as a city-level intangible cultural heritage.

The Hongkong Cheongsam-making technique is unique due to its historical background, having incorporated both Eastern and Western clothing designs before giving the Hongkong-style cheongsam its distinctive looks. In 2021, the Hong Kong cheongsam making technique was successfully listed on the fifth National List of Intangible Cultural Heritage.

=== Authenticity as ethnic wear ===
In Western countries, the cheongsam is widely perceived as being a quintessential Chinese garment. However, the cheongsam is a type of Chinese clothing which was developed in the 20th century under the influences of several cultures, including Western culture, Manchu culture, and the Han Chinese culture. The cheongsam also had a significant impact on international fashion centers in the 1950s and 1960s, such as Paris, Rome, and New York, due to its perceived exoticism and its slim line silhouette which was also fashionable in Europe at those times. Descendants of Chinese immigrants or overseas Chinese in Western countries, such as Canada, may wear cheongsam on events such as weddings, graduation ceremonies, and other occasions; however, the cheongsam is not always perceived as being traditional Chinese clothing; for example, some Canadians of Han Chinese descent still remember the use of aoqun as their traditional Chinese dress.

In Suriname, the cheongsam is not only presented as being the quintessential Chinese dress but also as the authentic Chinese ethnic clothing; however, the Chinese ethnic clothing, which should have been used, is the shanku, consisting of a shan (jacket) and a pair of ku trousers, as it was the attire which was worn by the Hakka people who came in Suriname as indentured laborers and chain immigrants. The use of cheongsam as a cultural marker of Chineseness can be thus perceived as ironic, and a cultural stereotype of Chineseness as the cheongsam is not associated with any specific ancestral clothing of Chinese immigrants.

In Indonesia, the cheongsam has experienced acculturation from Chinese culture and Indonesian culture, one of which is the batik-patterned cheongsam which has become the main cultural identity in Indonesia. In recent years, the trend of Chinese clothing combined with local elements has started to become popular. The euphoria of acculturating Chinese and Indonesian culture is driven by local Chinese citizens who want to show that they love their homeland. Cheongsam clothing made from batik is very attractive fashion, there are clothing models that are suitable to wear during Chinese New Year celebrations. Clothing that is an acculturation of Indonesian and Chinese culture is very suitable to complement the celebration.

=== Appreciation and rejection in overseas Chinese community ===
The cheongsam was introduced in Canada after the early 1930s with the flow of Chinese immigrants. However, wearing of the cheongsam is controversial amongst Canadians with Chinese heritage. Some may be reluctant to wear it publicly due to their experiences of being part of a racialized group or due to self-loathing due to the experiences of racism and marginalization in various forms, such as physical attacks, ostracism, and bullying, the social pressure to integrate or the desire to assimilate in the dominant culture as a protective mechanism even at the expense of rejecting any aspects or association with Chinese culture, identity, and appearance in the dress. Others may wear the cheongsam as an attempt to reconnect with their Chinese heritage or to show appreciation to the dress. Some may find themselves uncomfortable or feel alienation when wearing cheongsam due to the lack of self-identification with Chinese culture and Chinese identity.

=== Controversies on origin ===
The cheongsam is generally considered to be adapted from the one-piece dress of Manchu women during the Qing dynasty which survived from the 1911 Revolution surviving the political changes and improved until it has become the traditional dress for Chinese women. However, there has been considerable debate on the origin of the cheongsam in academic circles. The following are three common arguments on the origin of the cheongsam:

The first argument says that the cheongsam came directly from the clothing of the banner people when the Manchu ruled China during the Qing dynasty. This argument was prominently represented by Zhou Xibao (Chinese: 周锡保) in his work The History of Ancient Chinese Clothing and Ornaments.

The second opinion holds that the cheongsam inherited some features of the chángpáo of Banner People in the Qing dynasty, but the true origin of the cheongsam dates back to a period between the Western Zhou dynasty (1046–771 BC) and the pre-Qin era, approximately two millennia before the Qing dynasty. According to Yuan Jieying's (Chinese: 袁杰英) book Chinese Cheongsam, the modern cheongsam shares many similarities with the narrow-cut straight skirt that women wore in the Western Zhou dynasty. And Chinese Professor Bao Minxin (Chinese: 包铭新) also pointed out in his book A Real Record of Modern Chinese Costume that the cheongsam originated from the ancient robe in the Han dynasty (206 BC-220 AD). The robe is a one-piece upper and lower connected long dress which was quite popular among ladies in Han.

The third argument was raised by Bian Xiangyang (Chinese: 卞向阳) in his book An Analysis on the Origin of Qipao. Bian thinks that the cheongsam originates from neither the robe nor the chángpáo. It is an adaption of Western-style dress during the Republic of China era when people were open to the Western cultures. In his opinion, the cheongsam was a hybrid of traditional Chinese costumes and Western costumes such as the waistcoat and one-piece dress. Moreover, according to him, Chinese women traditionally wore ku trousers under their clothing and the use of silk stockings under the cheongsam or being bare legs is not a Chinese tradition but the result of Western influence.

== Similar garments ==
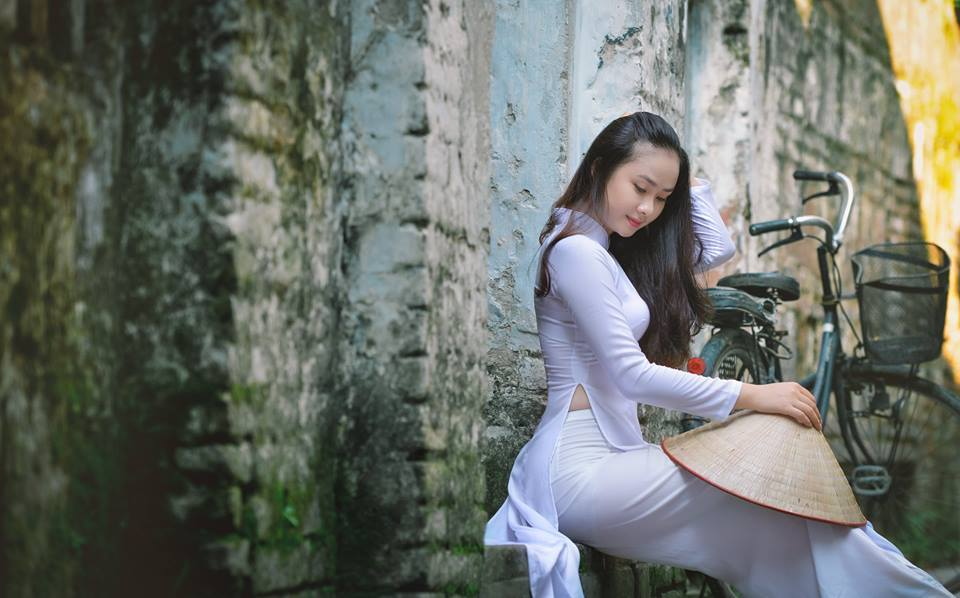
A girl wearing áo dài

The Vietnamese áo dài looks similar to the cheongsam as they both consist of a long robe with side splits on both sides of the robe with one of the main difference typically being the height of the side split. However, this is not an absolute distinguishing criterion.

The áo dài was developed from the clothing worn in Chinese court but it could only be worn by the royalty originally. The áo dài was derived from áo ngũ thân (lit. 'five-panel gown') which was a Nguyễn court fashion which drew strong influences from the civil and military official clothing practices used in China; the áo dài also evolved from the early prototypes decreed by Nguyễn Phúc Khoát.

In the 18th century, in an attempt to separate his domain from Tonkin ruled by his rival Trịnh clan and build an independent state, Lord Nguyễn Phúc Khoát (reigned 1738–1765) forced his subjects to wear Ming dynasty style Chinese clothing. The ethnic Kinh robe (i.e. the traditional áo giao lĩnh, a type of crossed-collar robe, which was identical to the ones worn by the Han Chinese). was, therefore, replaced by a robe with Chinese-style fasteners, which was buttoned in the front, and had an upright collar. The skirt which was worn by the Vietnamese was also replaced by trousers under his rule. This form of new fashion became the prototype of the áo dài; it was a form of áo ngũ thân which was invented by Lord Nguyễn Phúc Khoát; the áo ngũ thân also had 5 flaps instead of 4 (the 5th flap was small and was found under the front garment) and 5 buttons. Another new form of fashion included a type of four-panel robe which was described by Lê Quý Đôn as an áo dài which was loose fitting similarly to the áo giao lãnh. Under the rule of Emperor Minh Mạng, two new forms of áo dài were created from the áo ngũ thân regulated by Nguyễn Phúc Khoát: the áo tứ thân, and the Huế-style áo dài which was created with five flaps. The Huế-style áo dài represented royal court culture of the Huế and later developed influenced the modern áo dài.

== See also ==
- Hanfu
- Mao suit
- Chinese clothing
- Qizhuang
- Chinoiserie in fashion
- Qungua
