= Charles Le Gobien =

French Jesuit writer

Charles Le Gobien (1653 – 5 March 1708) was a French Jesuit writer, founder of the Lettres édifiantes et curieuses, a collection of reports from Jesuit missionaries in China. It is a major source of information for the history of Catholic missions and life in China in those times.

== Life ==
Le Gobien was born at Saint-Malo, Brittany. He entered the Society of Jesus on 25 November 1671. As professor of philosophy and especially while procurator of the Franco-Chinese mission, he sought in a series of papers to awaken interest in the work of Christianizing Eastern Asia. He died at Paris.

== Works ==
In 1697 his Lettres sur les progréz de la religion à la Chine appeared at Paris. Apropos of the Chinese Rites controversy, he published among other things Histoire de l'édit de l'empereur de la Chine en faveur de la religion chrétienne avec un éclaircissement sur les honneurs que les Chinois rendent à Confucius et aux morts (Paris, 1698); and in the year 1700: Lettre à un Docteur de la Faculté de Paris sur les propositions déférées en Sorbonne par M. Prioux. Under the same date there appeared in Paris the Histoire des Isles Mariannes nouvellement converties à la religion chrétienne. The second part, translated into Spanish by J. Delgado, is found in the latter's Historia General de Filipinas (Manila, 1892).

In 1702, Le Gobien published Lettres de quelques missionnaires de la Compagnie de Jésus, écrites de la Chine et des Indes Orientales; this was the beginning of the collection soon to be published under the title of Lettres édifiantes et curieuses écrites des missions étrangéres par quelques missionnaires de la Compagnie de Jésus. The first eight series were by Le Gobien, the latter ones by Du Halde, Patouillet, Geoffroy, and Maréchal. The collection was printed in thirty-six vols. duodecimo (Paris, 1703–76), and reissued in 1780-81 by Yves, de Querbeux, and Brotier in twenty-six vols. duodecimo, omitting the prefaces. New editions appeared in 1819, 1829–32, and 1838–43. One abridgment in four vols. octavo, was entitled Panthéon Littéraire, by L. Aimé Martin (1834–43). A partial English translation came out in London in 1714.

The publication incited the Austrian Jesuit Stöcklein to undertake his Neuer Welt Bott (about 1720), at first considered merely a translation, but soon an independent collection (five vols., folio in forty parts) substantially completing the Lettres Edifiantes (see Kath. Missionen, 1904–05).

== See also ==
University of Pennsylvania Online Books website, list of books by Charles Le Gobien

Good Reads website, list of books by Charles Le Gobien
