= Chinoiserie in fashion =

Chinoiserie fashion in American and European fashion

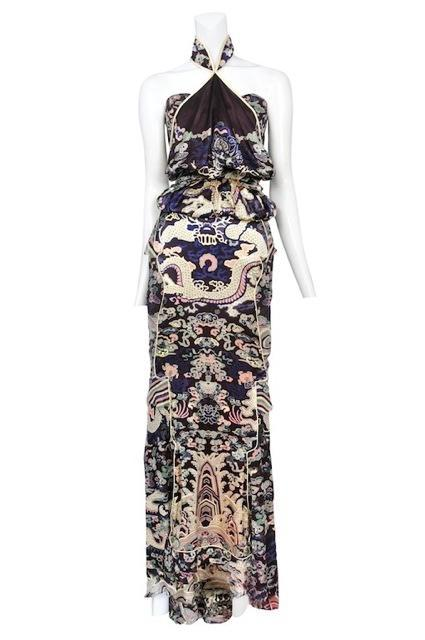
- Satin evening dress in Chinese dragon print by Tom Ford for Yves Saint Laurent Rive Gauche, 2004
- Type: Textiles patterns and motifs, garments, and accessories
- Material: Diverse
- Place of origin: China
- Introduced: Europe (Italy, France, United Kingdom), America (United States, Canada, Mexico)

Chinoiserie in fashion refers to the any use of chinoiserie elements in fashion, especially in American and European fashion. Since the 17th century, Chinese arts and aesthetic were sources of inspiration to European artists, creators, and fashion designers when goods from oriental countries were widely seen for the first time in Western Europe. Western chinoiserie was also often mixed with other exotic elements which were not all indigenous to China.

Throughout its history, chinoiserie in fashion was sometimes a display of cultural appreciation; but at times, it was also associated with exoticism, Orientalism, cultural appropriation, Western imperialism, and colonialism, and eroticism.

The imagining of China was always more fanciful than real. Trade provided products, but even more importantly, the West copied the Oriental land that it had never conquered. It never possessed the dragons, butterflies, or pagodas that it admired and emulated. If it was an unrequited colonialism, the West's passion for China abides today in the continuing aesthetic fascination for that Far East land

— Richard Harrison Martin & Harold Koda, Orientalism: Visions of the East in Western Dress (1994), published by the Metropolitan Museum of Art, 18–19

== History ==
=== Pre-17th century ===
China traded luxury goods to Europe from ancient times, and early contacts of Europeans with China also directly influenced European fashion. Silk from China, as well as textiles from India and Turkey, were extremely popular among European royalty. The art of sericulture itself originated in China and was introduced to the West via the Byzantine Empire. The secret of sericulture was eventually smuggled out of China in the 6th century by the Byzantine Empire and then became an important component of Byzantine industry allowing the Byzantine empire to gain a monopoly of silk in Europe. From the eleventh century CE, the art of sericulture spread to Italy and to Southern France. However, the import of raw silk from China continued to remain significant.

During the Italian Renaissance period (14th to 17th centuries), Italians saw Imperial China as a refined civilization which was equal to Europe (except for religion) and very advanced in terms of science, technology, architecture, and culture; as such, Italian élites would dress in Chinese fashion to show off their wealth. These Chinese influences in fashion were illusions created by Italian craftsmen who had started to produce in Lucca and had appropriated Chinese cultural symbols, such as lotus flowers, pomegranates, peonies, florets, phoenixes and dragons.

Chinese silk which was manufactured in China to appeal to European taste continued to be imported into Europe; this import increased even more in the late-17th century as traders established direct maritime links between China and Europe. The introduction of items, such as painted silk, pearls, and umbrellas, from China was also sped up in the 1400s through the sea routes.

In the 16th century, Europe imported Chinese brocades to make the vestments for priests in Roman Catholic cathedrals. According to British records dating to the late-19th century, gold foil was the ordinary form of precious metal which was used in embroidery and was a Chinese invention wherein Chinese people invented the process of laying a thin gold leaf on paper before rolling it around a silk thread. Chinese gold-thread technology was later introduced in the West and adopted by Italian weavers in their goldwork.

=== 17th to 18th century ===
The 17th to 18th centuries, Western fashion was greatly enriched by the various items which were imported from the East which led to the introduction of new patterns and new possibilities in Western dress and was immediately imitated by mills found in England and France. As China was considered as the greatest empire in the 17th and 18th century, China and chinoiserie became in vogue in Europe; chinoiserie in this period, however, was the result of a conscious attempt in making "oriental culture" acceptable to the taste of Europeans.

==== 17th century ====
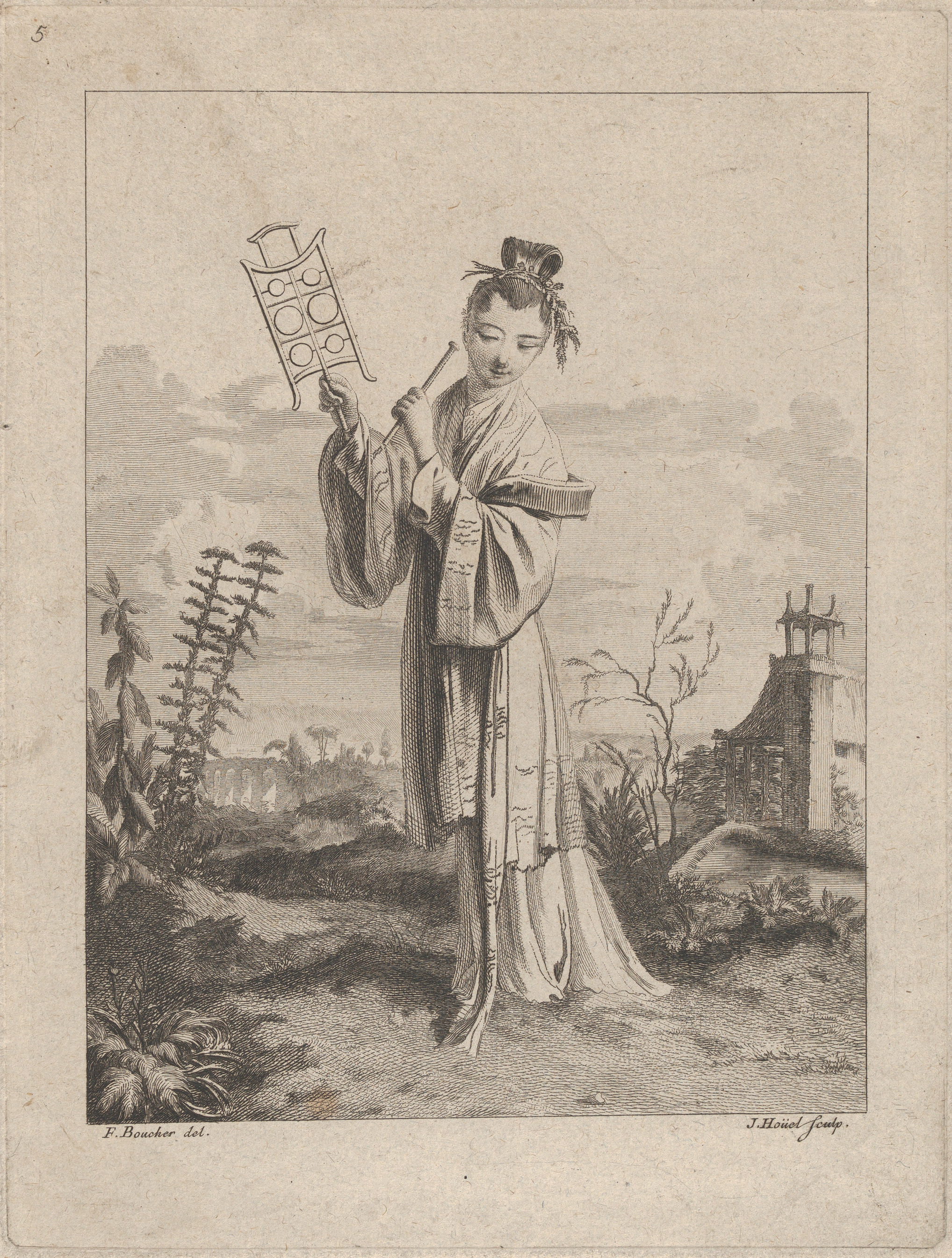
Chinese-style fashion in Chinoserie art by François Boucher, 1755 – 1776

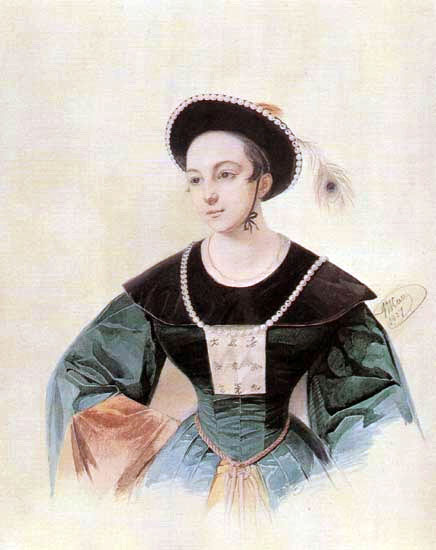
Russian actress wearing chinoiserie fashion, 1838

In the 17th century, Chinese luxury items, such as Chinese textiles and porcelain, were introduced in Italian port cities, Portugal, England, and Holland; these items were what Europeans used to informed themselves about the customs and cultures of the East. Imported porcelain from China depicted how clothing was worn in China while Imported Chinese textiles led to fascination in Europe due to the technical skills found in the weaving, hand-painting, and needlework of Chinese silk. Chinese textiles were readily tailored into Western-style garments. The large amounts of imported Chinese patterned silk textiles in the Western-sphere also influenced the Europeans' perception of Chinese designs; this became known as chinoiserie. Chinoiserie, however, was the result of the European's misunderstandings of authentic Chinese art and life.

Not only did Europe import Chinese textiles, but they also imitated Chinese textiles. Moreover, import of textiles from Asia by the East India companies in the late 17th and early 18th centuries influenced European designs creating a "bizarre style" as designs and motifs were blended into strange and familiar motifs and was influenced by chinoiserie and Japonisme.

==== 18th century ====
In the 18th century, China was tremendously popular in France, leading to what was referred as the "Oriental Renaissance" by Edgar Quinet in 1848. From this period and throughout the 19th century, chinoiserie was especially celebrated in France, and the origin of most Chinese-inspired fashion was French during this period. French Chinese fashion, which involved the wearing of petticoats with frills, was also introduced in England where it became fashionable among British women; it is however unknown if British women were aware that they were wearing French Chinese fashion. This craze for China was also shared by England which also showed an obsession for Chinese culture objects in the 18th century. Chinoiserie was also a popular theme in masquerade balls, and King Gustav III of Sweden was even dressed in Chinese robes by the Swedish royal family at some point in his lifetime when they were at the summer palace in Drottningholm. The craze for chinoiserie however started to wane in England in the second half of the eighteenth century and further receded in Europe during the 19th century.

=== 19th century ===
As a result of Europe being at the wake of industrialization, and due to Europeans' perception that Chinese civilization was almost outdated following the first and the second Opium Wars lead to the decrease of chinoiserie popularity in Europe. However, this period was marked by an era of universal colonial exchanges and exposure to various categories found in Orient, such as textiles (e.g. silk) from China and Chinese dress elements (e.g. the precursor of the cheongsam).

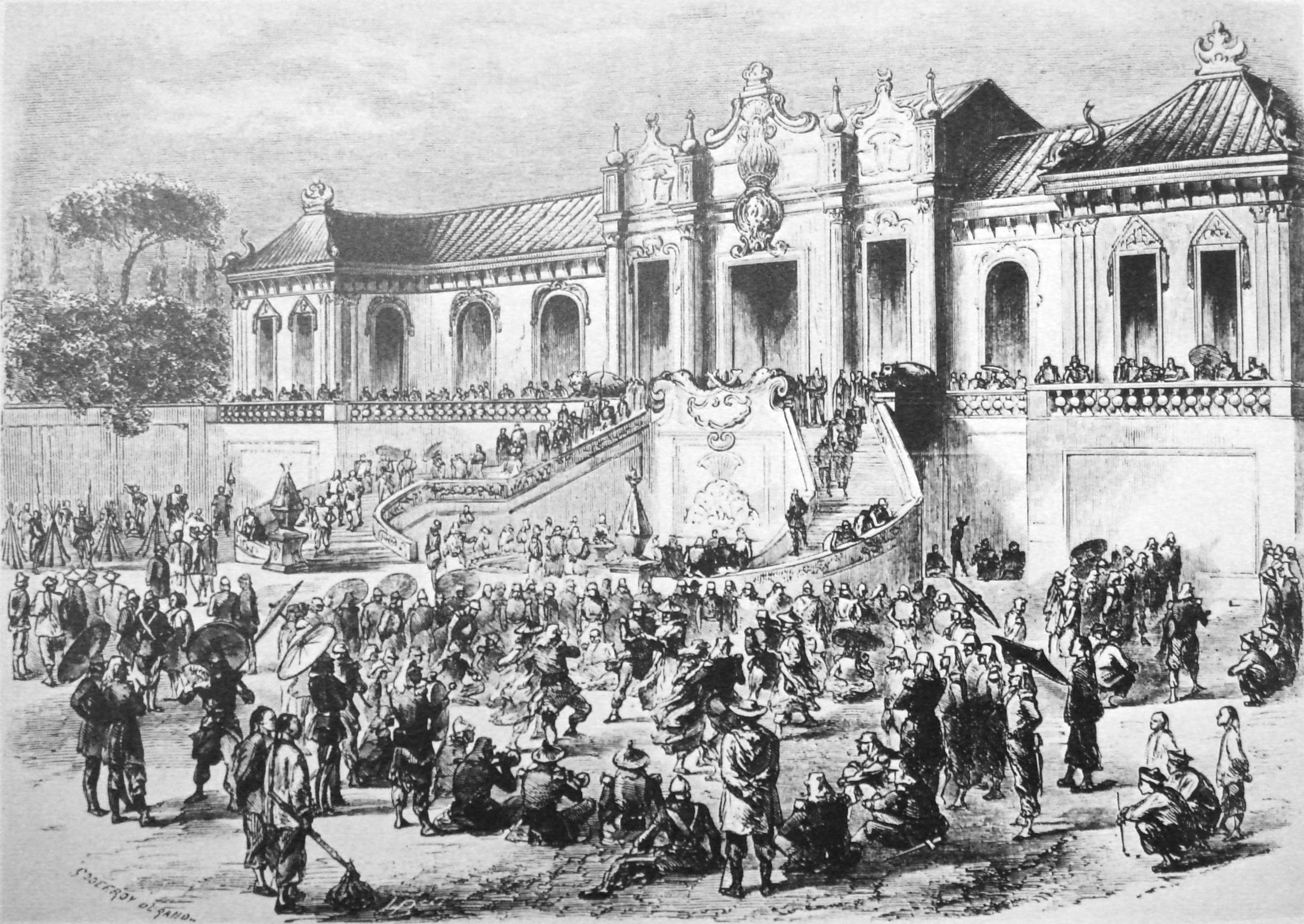
Looting of the Old Summer palace by Anglo-French forces in 1860, illustration dated to 22 December 1860

Many items were looted from China and brought back to Europe during this period. The Old Summer Palace, known as Yuanmingyuan (traditional Chinese: 圓明園; simplified Chinese: 圆明园; pinyin: Yuánmíng Yuán; lit. 'Gardens of Perfect Brightness') in Chinese, in particular, which was sacked by Anglo-French forces in 1860s gained the "mythical status as a source of Chinese objects in the West". From the looting of the Old Summer Palace, the French not only looted the imperial treasures, but also forced open the imperial warehouses stealing shiploads of clothing, jewellery, hats, and rolls of fabrics, amongst many other items. Looted items from the Old Summer Palace also flooded the markets of Britain; a cap which was said to have belonged to the Chinese emperor was presented to Queen Victoria, along with a pekingese dog, which became known as Looty. In Europe, these looted items were sometimes cut into a western-style clothing. At the end of the 19th century, British chinoiserie fashion had incorporated key elements from the construction design of Chinese clothing, including the use of wide sleeves and side closure. However, their passion of the British for chinoiserie had vanished.

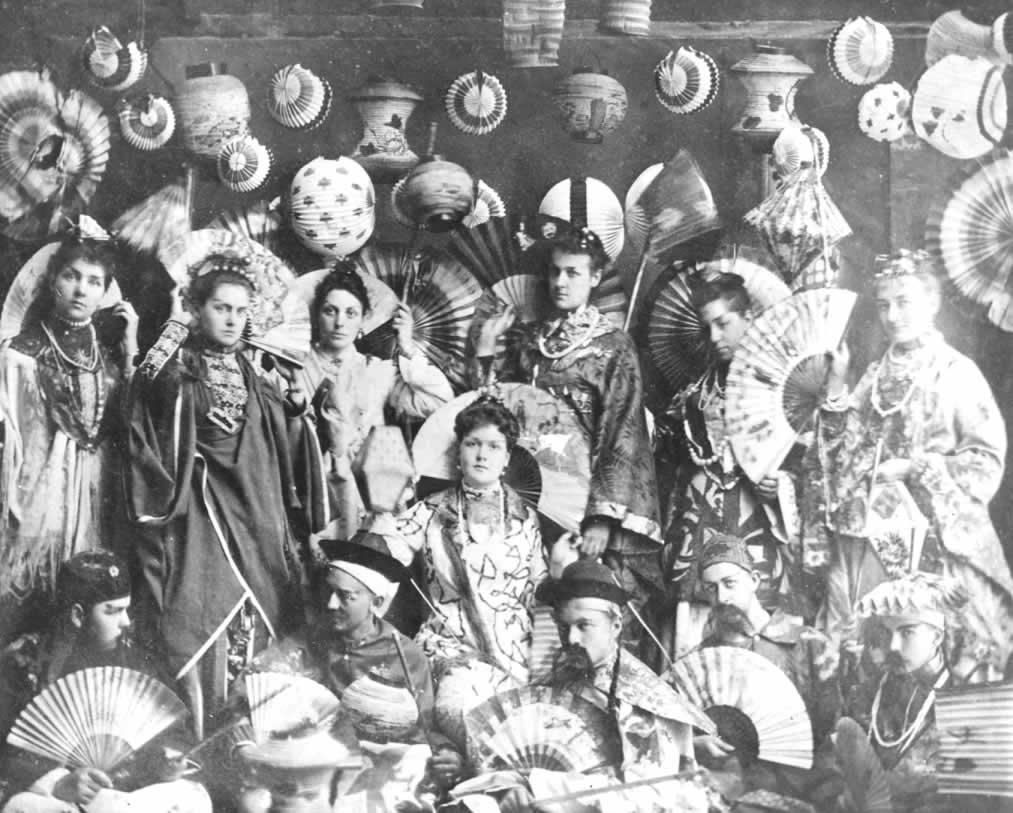
Women wear Hanfu-style clothing while men wear Qizhuang-style attire; they also hold Japanese fans in their hands; photograph taken in Spring 1886, Cobourg, Ontario, Canada.

On the other hand, the 19th century was when chinoiserie was fully developed in America as a kind of "aesthetic colonialism" associating China with exoticism and fantasy, perceiving it as "a fantastic, uncivilized nation"; the upper classes, especially those in New England and the Middle Colonies, imitated chinoiseriee fashion; following their independence from Britain, they eventually ventured to China where they directly imported Chinese items. The late 1800s was thus marked with Westerner's fascination to the Far East, especially China and Japan, including in Canada.

In the 1850s, there was a deliberate and self-conscious usage of Chinese materials and symbols in the design of dresses. Floral medallions, for example, were used on dresses as they were characteristics of China.

A second wave of looted items from the suppression of the Boxer Uprising (1899–1901) also made its way to Britain. During the suppression of the Boxer Uprising, many places were looted, including many pawnshops in Beijing. Clothing items by far were the largest-volume trade in these pawnshops, but they also had other items of value, such as jewellery, watches, furniture, rickshaws, and musical instrument; these items were personal items of Beijing commoners who had exchanged their personal items for a small sum of money and intended to redeem their items later when they would be in better financial times. Wearing Chinese clothing at home in the West was not deemed as being done out of frivolity or fancy, but was itself an imperial act which signified having worldly knowledge.

=== 20th century ===
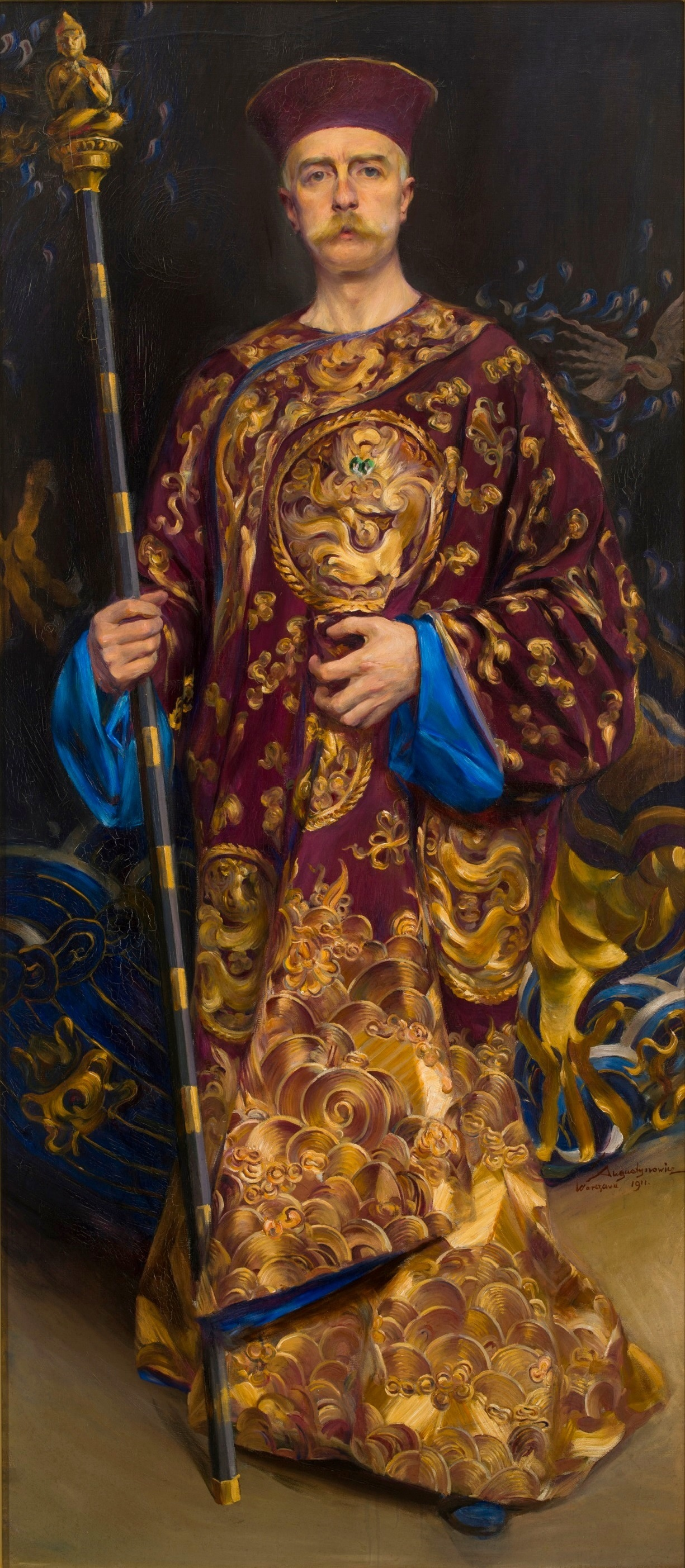
Aleksander Augustynowicz in chinoiserie-style dragon robe, 1911

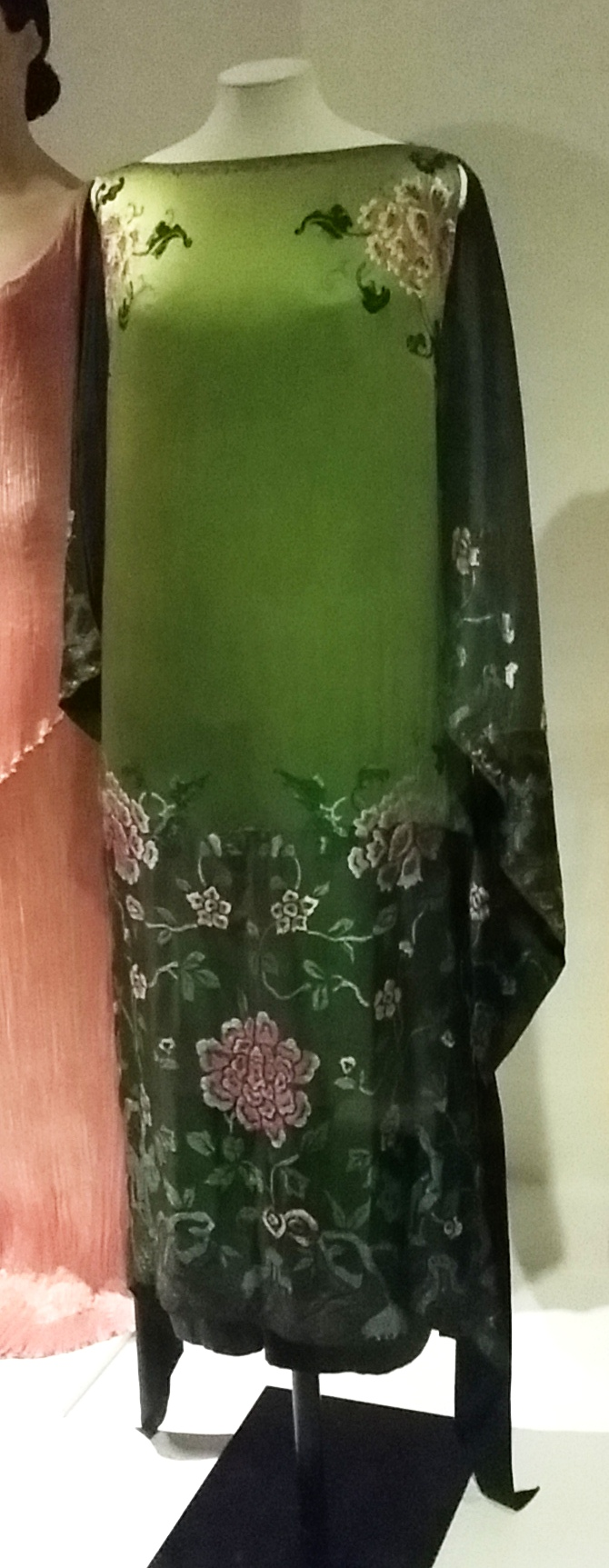
Evening dress with Chinese-style floral embroidery by the Callot sisters

In the early 20th century, European and fashion designers would use China and other countries outside of the Eurocentric-fashion world to seek inspiration; Vogue also acknowledged that China had contributed to the aesthetic inspiration to global fashion. Chinese motifs regrew popular in European fashion during this period. China and the Chinese people also supplied the materials and aesthetics to American fashion and influenced global fashion; however, they remained perceived as being fashion-less and did not fit the criteria of modern status. For example, in the early 1900s, Vogue encouraged people to buy beautifully embroidered Chinese garments made of high-quality silk in Chinatowns, which were sold as cheap items in America; however, many of these items were actually looted items from Beijing during the suppression of the Boxer Uprising.

From the 1910s in the United Kingdoms, Chinese robes, which were perceived as being only suitable as a fancy or luxurious dress or a source of embroidery pieces, started to be worn by British women as a form of loose coats.

==== 1920s to 1930s ====
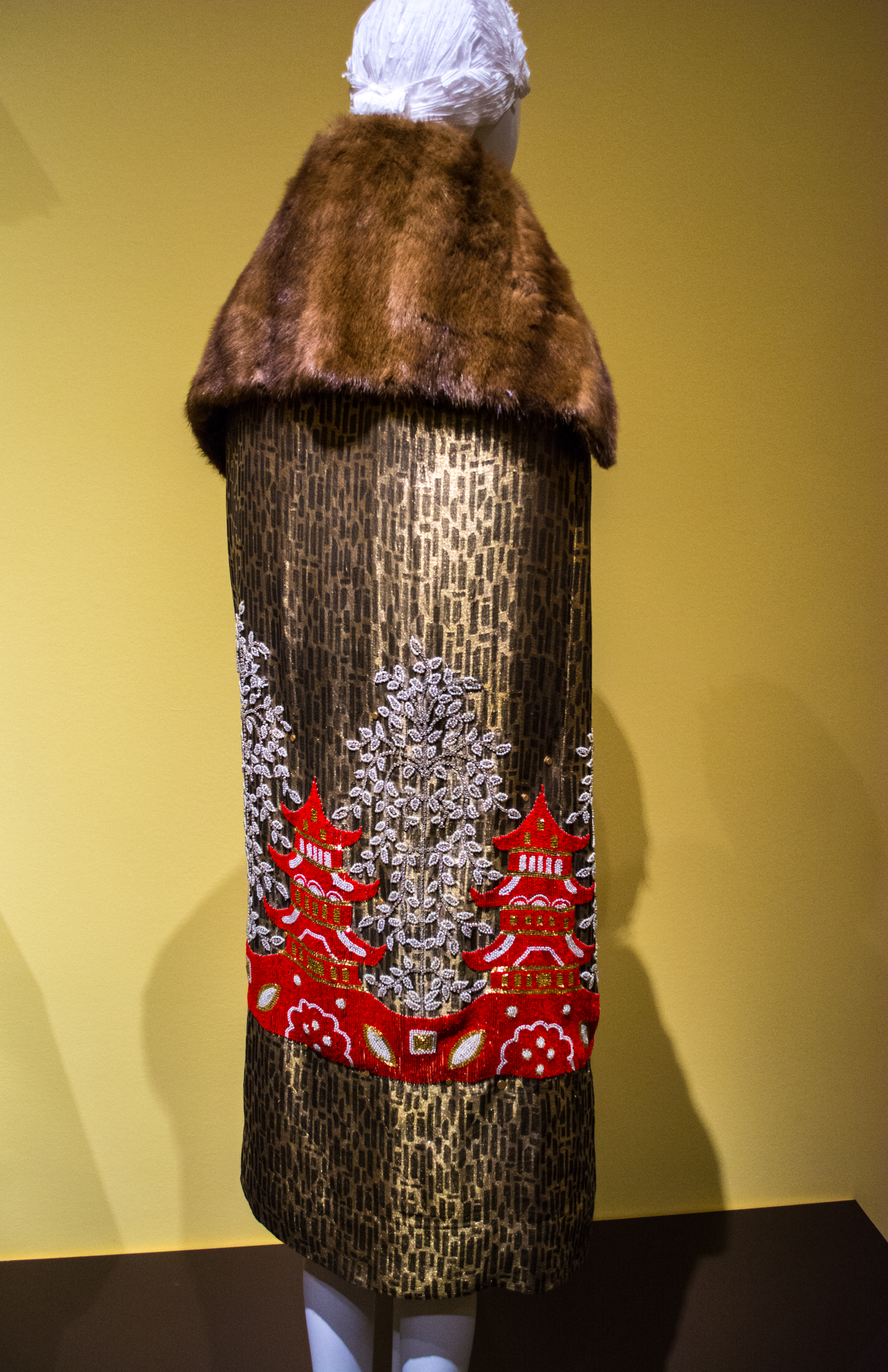
Cape in chinoiserie fashion, likely designed by Jean Patou in 1930

The 1920s was marked by the return of a great craze for chinoiserie. Genuine embroidered Chinese jackets and coats were worn as evening wear. The loose fitting cut of British women garments in the 1920s also reflects the influence of Chinese clothing.

The cheongsam was created in the 1920s and was turned into a high-style evening wear when it was appropriated by the West. By the 1930s, the cheongsam was associated with Chinese dress and was used in Hollywood movies as the identifying clothing of Chinese women. When worn by Asian Hollywood stars, such as Anna May Wong, the sexualized version cheongsam was turned into a symbol of the exotic and erotic nightlife in Shanghai.

==== 1940s to end of 20th century ====
In the mid-20th century, chinoiserie influenced the designs of great designers and/or couturiers, such as Christian Dior and Yves Saint-Laurent.

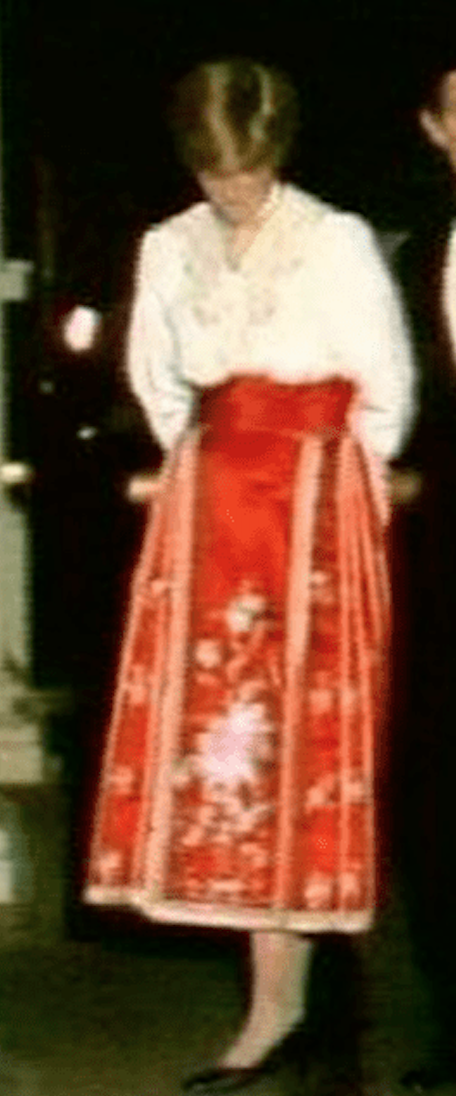
Princess Diana wearing a langan-style mamianqun, 23 February 1981

On 23 February 1981, Princess Diana wore a red coloured silk, midi Chinese skirt known as mamianqun when she posed with Prince Charles at Clarence House prior to their official engagement announcement. This Chinese skirt was in the Qing dynasty langan style and was embroidered with chrysanthemum embroidery motifs. and had a red waistband. The use of auspicious red colour was in line with Chinese wedding tradition; however, the skirt was not considered fully auspicious according to Chinese beliefs as it lacked a white waistband instead of a red one. A mamianqun with white waistband was usually worn by Chinese bride to symbolize: "to grow old together", which Princess Diana lacked; and thus, Princess Diana's mamianqun was did not conform to the guiju (Chinese: 规矩; lit. 'established rules') and was instead considered buxiangde yuzhao (Chinese: 不祥的预兆; pinyin: bùxiángde yùzhào; lit. 'inauspicious omen'), a sign of bad omen.

== 21st century ==
Chinoiserie fashion continues to appears in the work of fashion designers and directive creators of luxury brands in the 21st century. For instances, chinoiserie appeared have been a key seasonal influence to Louis Vuitton Spring/ Summer 2011 collections; for example, with the use of brisé fan by Marc Jacobs, etc. The Valentino Fall/Winter 2015–2016 depicted the use of colourful Chinese motifs, such as lion's heads, flowers, plants, in the embroidery work on their clothing and handbags, which were described as "reinterpretations of symbols representing human qualities and spiritual values" by the Magazine Vogue.

== Designers ==
Some famous fashion designers and/or creative directors, who are known to have adopted or incorporated chinoiserie aesthetics at some point in their fashion collection, include Mariano Fortuny, the Callot Soeurs who were known for their usage of Chinese silks, Chinese-style embroideries, had Orientalism as their favourite theme, Jean Paquin, Paul Poiret, Jeanne Lanvin, Christian Dior, Yves Saint-Laurent, Alexander McQueen, John Galliano, Tom Ford, and Maria Grazia Chiuri. Chinoiserie continues to appears in fashion creation in present-days. Luxury fashion brands such as, Louis Vuitton, Dior, and Chanel, etc., were also inspired by Chinese art and aesthetics, these influences are sometimes reflected in their creation of colours and the patterns found on their fabrics.

=== Christian Dior ===
Christian Dior, who had never travelled to China, especially celebrated Chinese aesthetics since the 1947; Chinese aesthetics in his design collections were influenced by Chinese overcoats and have been inspired by the "exotic" (chinoiserie) home decor of his childhood; throughout the 1960s, Dior used various cultural references to China, such as Chinese calligraphy, the silhouette of the cheongsam, and the Tang dynasty blue and white porcelain in various of his collections.

=== Yves Saint-Laurent ===
Like Christian Dior, Yves Saint-Laurent was very inspired by Chinese culture although he never visited China; this is also reflected in his 1977's collection "Les Chinoises":

Beijing, however, remains a dazzling memory. The China that I had so often interpreted in my designs was exactly as I had imagined it. All I need for my imagine to blend into a place or a landscape is a picture book. … I don't feel any need to go there. I have already dreamt about it so much.

— Yves Saint Laurent, in Elle, 25 December 1995

== Sources of fashion inspiration ==
=== Chinese auspicious ornaments and textile ===
The most visible form of chinoiserie is through the appropriation of Chinese decorative (and auspicious) motifs and styles. During the Italian Renaissance, Italian craftsmen appropriated Chinese cultural and auspicious symbols, such as the lotus flowers, pomegranates, peonies, florets, phoenixes and dragons in their textiles which were then used in fashionable dressmaking for the wealthy Italian social class. Chinese motifs also grew in popularity in European fashion in the 20th century.

==== Textile obtained through imperialistic appropriation ====
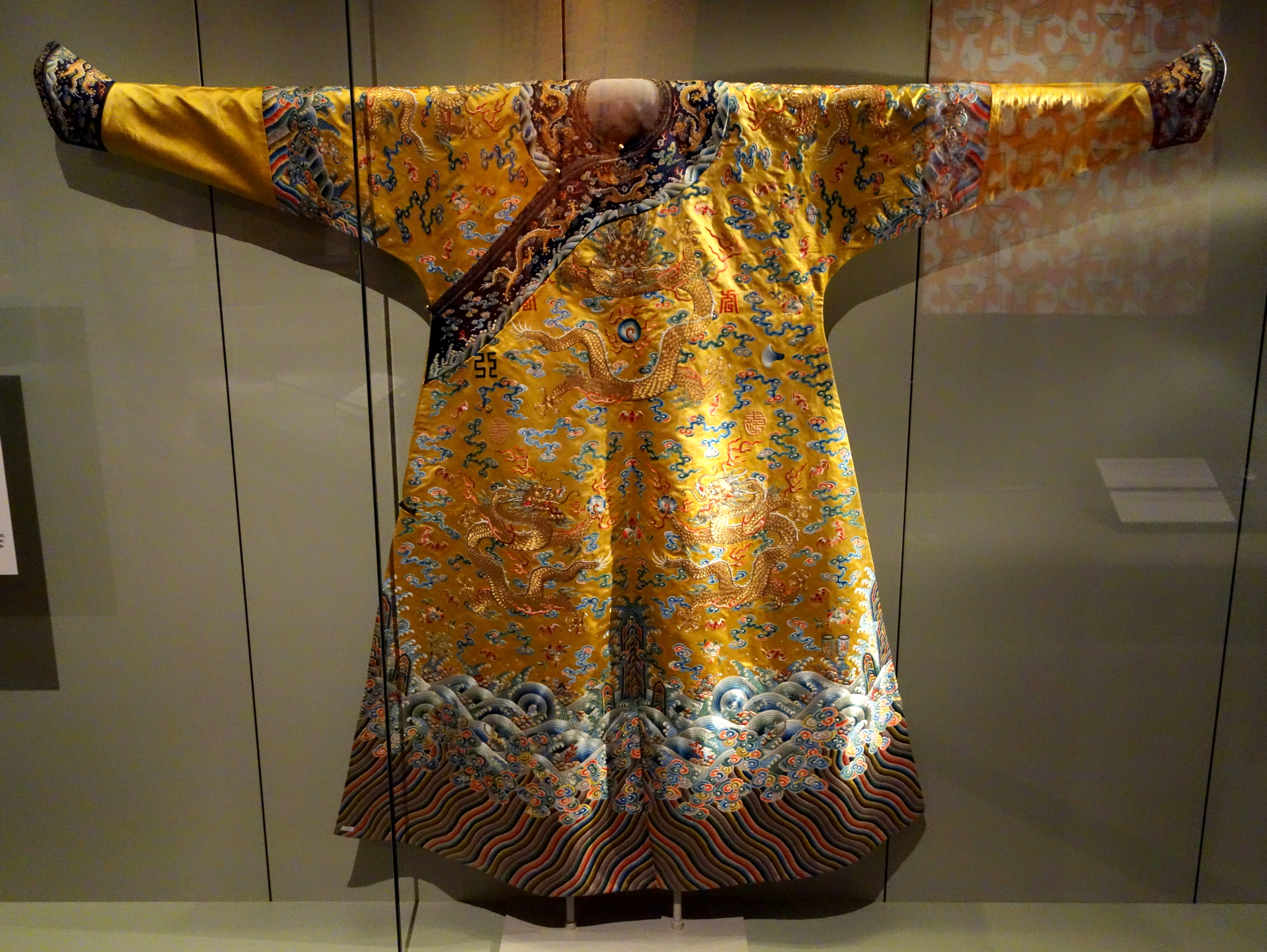
Yellow dragon robe worn by the emperor of the Qing dynasty, 18th century

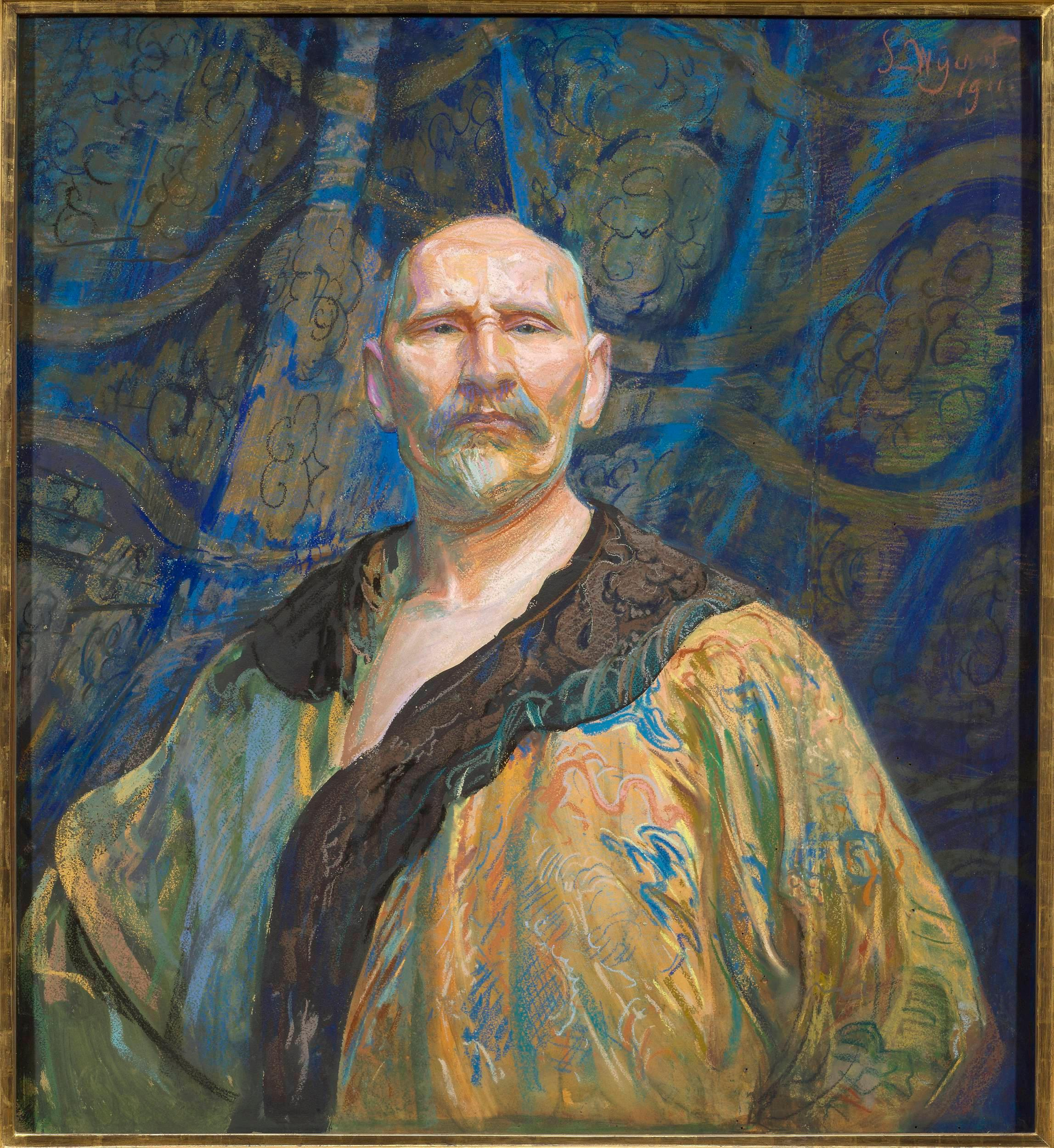
Leon Wyczółkowski wearing a dragon robe, 1911

Dragon robes (and python robes) of the Qing dynasty were highly regulated by the Qing dynasty's Sumptuary laws and court and the workshops and storehouses were managed by the Qing Imperial Household Department. They were also typically bestowed by the Qing dynasty court to important people within the Qing Empire boundaries, such as Mongolia and Tibet as diplomatic gifts, who were allowed to cut and adapt to fit their own customs.

In chinoiserie fashion of the early 20th century, the dragon robes (and python robes) were at times cut and converted into Western-style attire, such as banyan and waistcoat; however, the direct alterations of Chinese garments for the use of Westerners are sometimes regarded as "imperialistic appropriation". Some of these adapted dragon robe clothing were possibly fabric rolls and/or clothing looted from the Old Summer Palace contrary to what museum donors sometimes wish explain about their origins. During the Opium wars, the use of Chinese dragons robes by Europeans in the late Victorian Europe were sometimes used to mock Chinese masculinity; for example, George Smith in the painting The Rightful Heir, exhibited in 1874 in the Royal Academy, would paint the villain found in the painting wearing a Chinese dragon robe tied with a belt around the waist with slippers on his feet. In similar instances, Liberty in 1898 offered evening capes which were advertised as being made of "Mandarin robes" (i.e. Qing dynasty court dress); however, these capes were actually made of Han Chinese women's traditional skirts. In 1981,

==== Blue and white porcelain ====
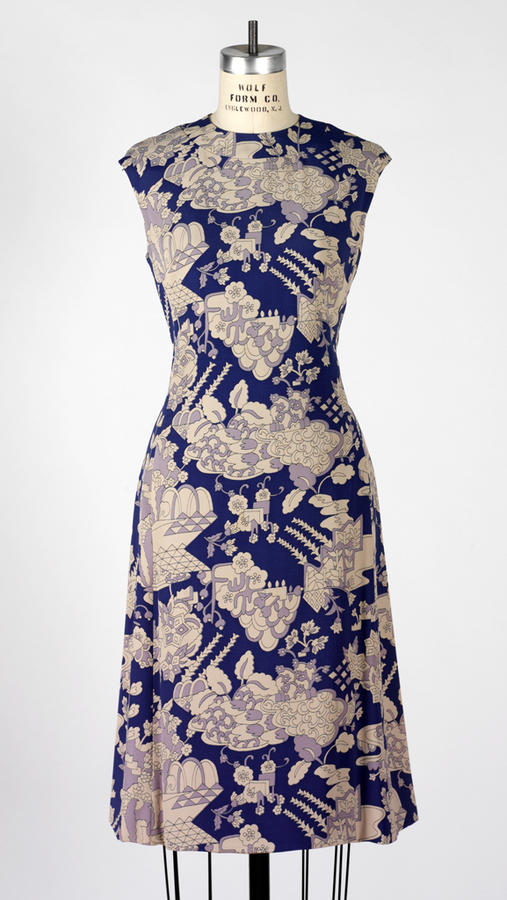
White and blue printed silk dress by Vera Maxwell, c.1965

The combination of blue and white colour is one of the most popular colour palette combination in history and originated from Asian ceramics of the 9th century. Chinese blue and white porcelain, which was developed since the Tang dynasty and fully matured in Yuan dynasty, and are one of the most nationalistic arts of China, often appears in modern fashion shows. This colour palette found in ceramics later spread in Europe and influenced the Delftware in the 16th century and Willow pattern created by British manufacturers in the later 18th century; the 18th century was also the era when printed fabrics such as blue and white Toile de Jouy gained popularity and inspired fashion designers to use the blue and white as a prominent colour palette in the coming year. It was thus adopted in fashion designs of garments and shoes of famous fashion designers, such as Christian Dior, Valentino, Dr Martens. Some modern fashion designers, such as Roberto Cavalli, Guo Pei, were also directly inspired by Chinese blue and white porcelain. (Note: A blue and white dress worn by Victoria Beckham in 2005 by Roberto Cavalli dress with printed designs was inspired by Chinese blue and white porcelain; some dress designs Guo Pei in 2010–2011 was also influenced by Chinese blue and white porcelain.)

=== Adoption of Chinese garments, clothing elements, and construction ===
British chinoiserie fashion had incorporated key elements from the construction design of Chinese clothing, including the use of wide sleeves and side closure; these designs were then adapted to meet the aesthetic tastes of Europeans. Chinese fashion also influenced various designs and styles of déshabillé.

The design of wrap-style closure or neckline, known as jiaoling (Chinese: 交領; lit. 'intersecting collar') in China, in European garments was the results of the heavy influences of Orientalism which was popular in the 19th century. (Note: Such as British tea gowns of the 19th century)

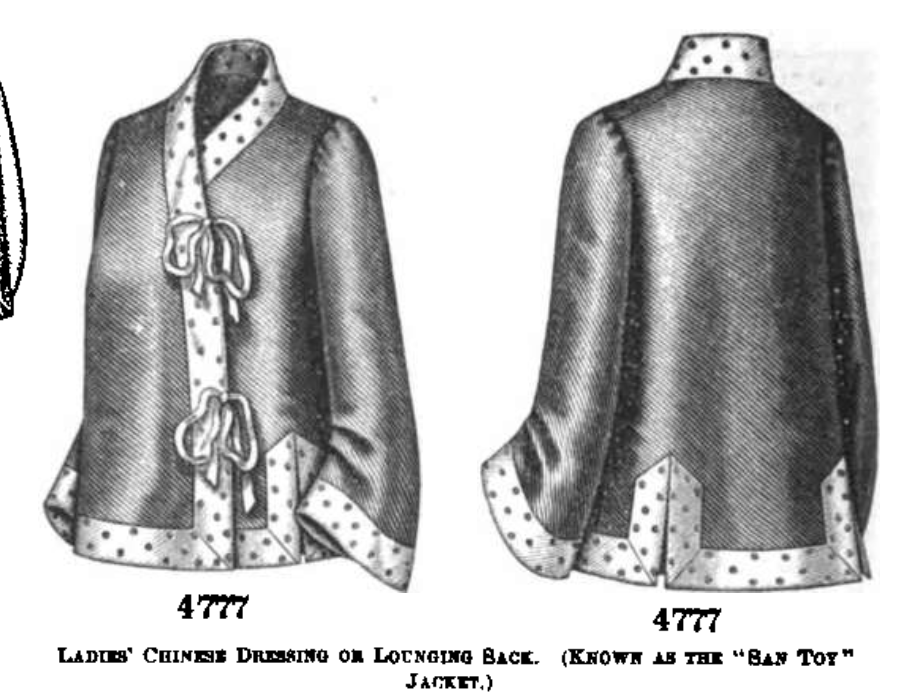
A wrap top called San toy, the Ladies' Chinese dressing or lounging sack, a design published in 1901 in The Delineator, Volume 57, p. 210

Chinese jackets with wrap closure also influenced American fashion in the early 1900s; an example of such jacket is the San toy (#4777), which appeared in American women's magazine, The Delineator, in 1901. In volume 57, The Delineator described it as being "Ladies' Chinese dressing" or as a "Lounging sack", and as having "a strong suggestion of the Orient". The San toy was designed to be loose-fitting, a wrap closure on the left side (known as jiaoling zuoren in China) which closes with satin ribbon ties; it also featured deep side vents, which was considered as being a "novel effect", and was trimmed with a single band creating a fancy outline. The San toy of Volume 57 (#4777) reappeared in Volume 58 of The Delineator along with another Chinese-style inspired wrap top (#3920), one of which closed on the right side (known as jiaoling youren in China) with a single ribbon. The Ladies' Chinese dressing sac #3920 appeared at least a year earlier and was published in Volume 56 of The Delineator of 1900.

In the 1910s, Euro-American women showed women in Chinese robes used as loose evening coats over dresses. Among the items which were advertised by Vogue in its 15 December 1911 publication, there was the aoqun, which composed of the ao a type of Chinese jackets, and the Qing dynasty-style mamianqun, a traditional skirt of the Han Chinese. There was also a fashion trend for day-wear jackets and coats to be cut in styles which would suggest various Chinese items as was published the Ladies’ Home Journal in June 1913. According to the Ladies’ Home Journal of June 1913, volume 30, issue 6:

Interest in the political and civic activities of the new China, which is more or less world-wide at this time, led the designers of this page [p.26] and the succeeding one [p.27] to look to that country for inspiration for clothes that would be unique and new and yet fit in with present-day modes and the needs and environments of American women [...]

— Ladies’ Home Journal: The Chinese Summer Dress, published in June 1913: Vol 30, issue 6, p. 26

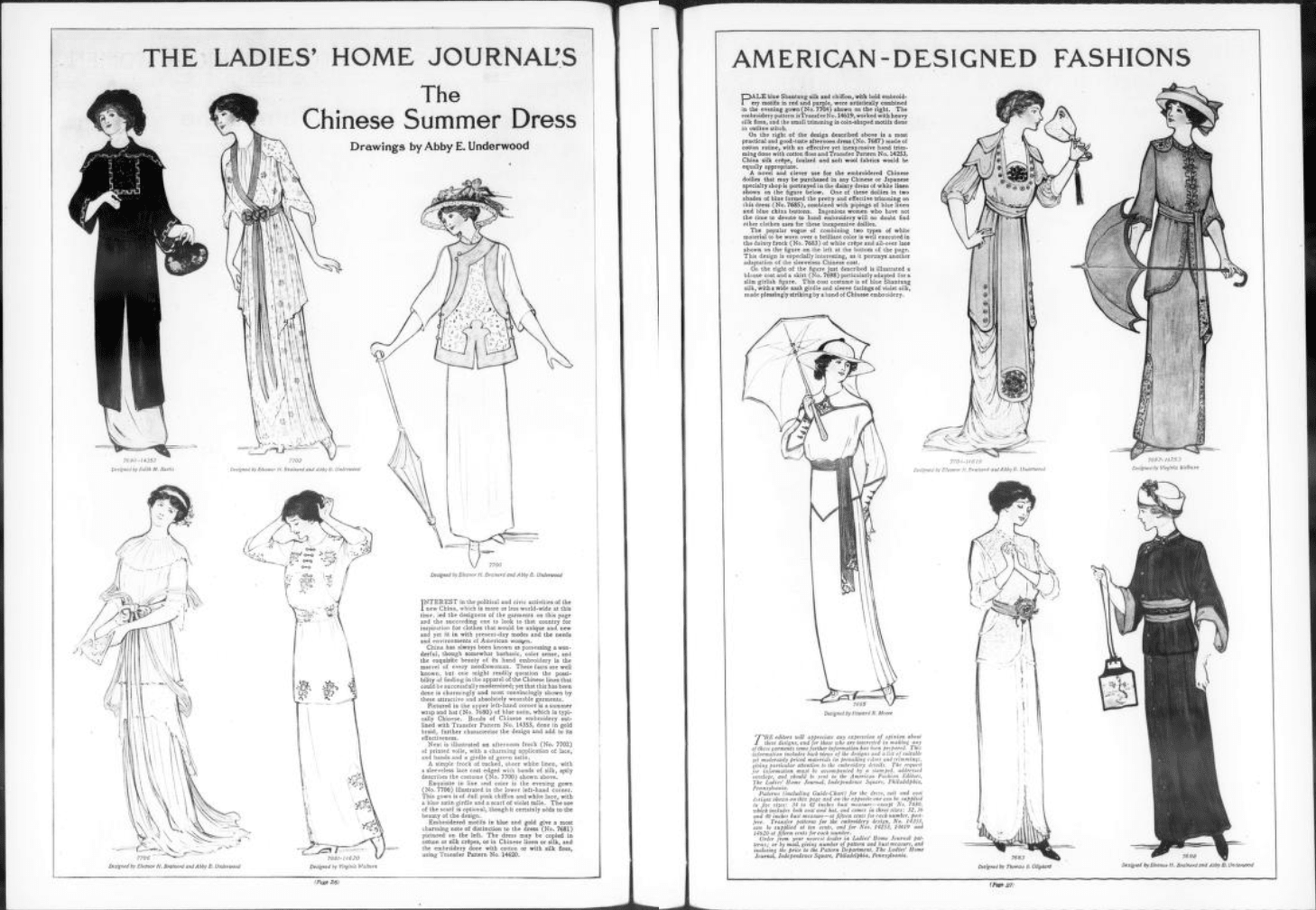
Chinese-style garments, inspired diverse Chinese-style and Manchu-style garments, designed by US designers in the 1910s, published from the Chinese Summer dress from Ladies’ Home Journal of June 1913: Vol 30 Issue 6, page 26 and 27

Garments displayed from The Chinese Summer Dress published in the Ladies’ Home Journal of June 1913, volume 30, issue 6, show influences of the Qing dynasty mandarin court gown, especially the bufu (a mandarin court dress with a mandarin square badge), the jiaoling ruqun, kanjia, mamianqun, yunjian, yaoqun (a short waist-length overskirt), piling (collar in Qing dynasty court dress), chenyi and changyi (Manchu women dresses), ao and gua, as well as traditional Chinese embroideries, and traditional Chinese lào zi, pankou, Mandarin collars, etc.

There are also photographic evidences of Chinese robes being used outside its wearer's home as fashion items with little or no adaption from the 1920s. The loosening of women's fashion found in the 1920s loose-fitting fashion, especially the disappearance of nipped-in corset, appears to have also been influenced by the loose lines and roomy armholes of the traditional Chinese robes and jackets along with other factors, such as the experience of freedoms of elite women at that time, the sportswear-designs of Chanel, and the garment designs by Paul Poiret who designed Middle-Eastern inspired garments.

=== Cheongsam ===
The cheongsam was created in the 1920s and was originally a symbol of women emancipation in China; when it was appropriated by the West, it was turned into a high-style evening wear.

In the 21st century, some evening dresses designed by Tom Ford showed the influences of the sexualized version cheongsam in terms of cut and the imperial five-clawed Chinese dragon robes in terms of use of colour (e.g. imperial yellow) and Chinese motifs (such as xiangyun clouds, Lishui, and the Twelve Ornaments), as well as the Manchu's horsehoof cuffs.

=== Chinese shawls ===
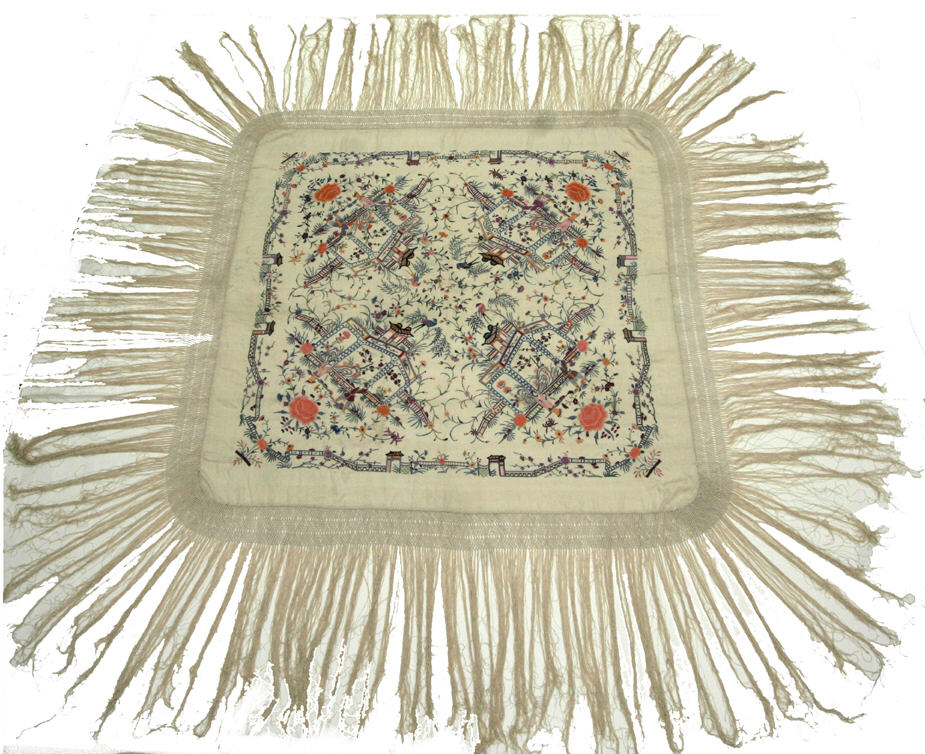
An exported white silk Chinese shawl, made for the Western market, early 20th century

Chinese shawls were popular among European elite style leaders in the early 20th century. However, in a report dating to 1921 written by Vogue, it was referred as Spanish shawls, and readers were informed that these shawls were imported from Venice, Spain, Persia, and the Philippines, while omitting the initial Chinese importation of these shawls when earlier importers of Chinese goods and other travellers to China were key sources for these shawls twenty years prior to the publication of the report.

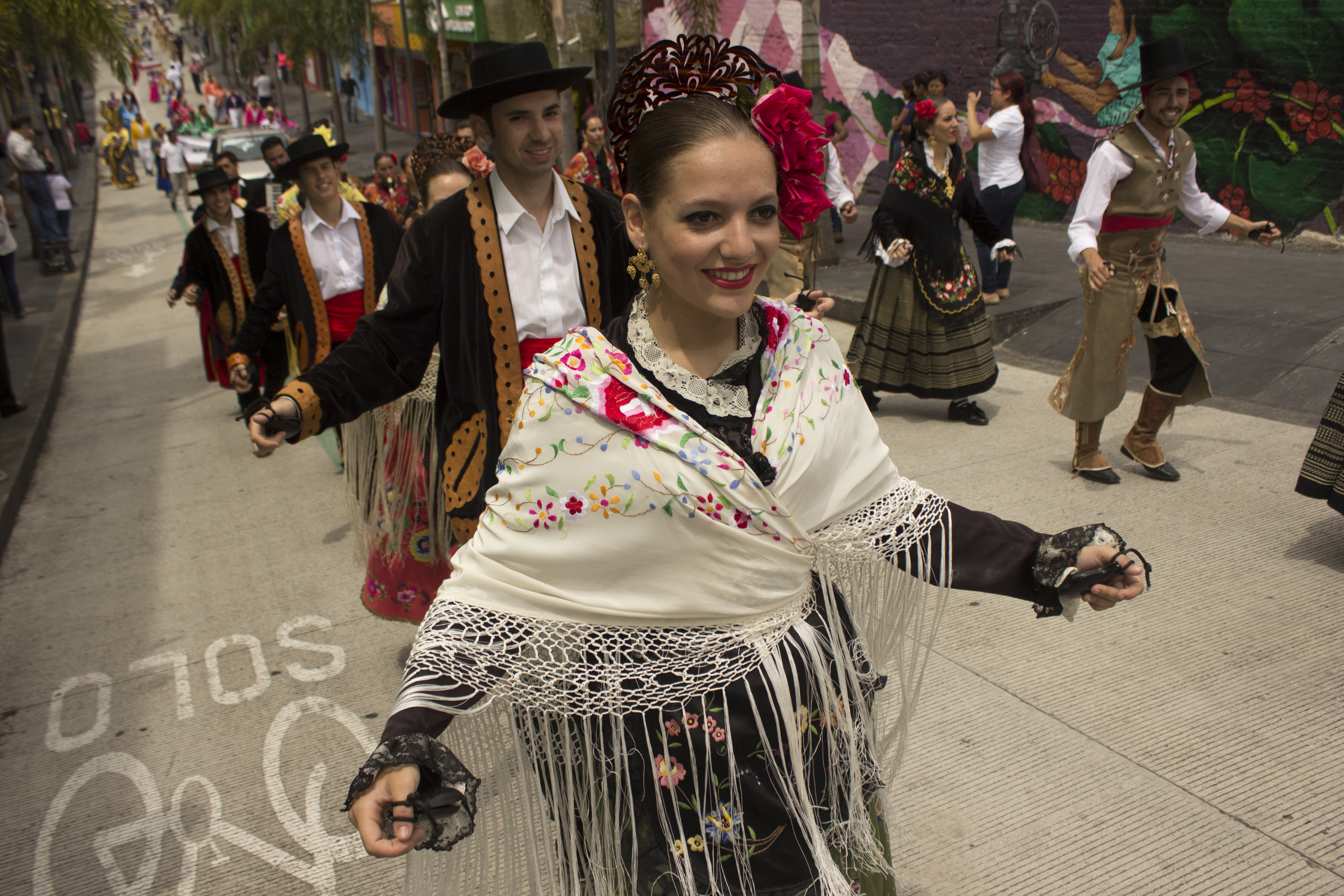
Spanish shawls, 2016

The Spanish shawls, also known as Manila shawls and mantón de Manila, have become traditional accessory for women in Spain and Latin America and is also a crucial feature in Flamenco dance costume. The term Manila shawl itself is a misnomer, which appeared when the America-European people got confused concerning the origins and provenance of the shawl, thus leading to a misattribution to the Philippines. These shawls of Chinese origins then became identified with Spanish ladies.

The Chinese shawls were manufactured in Guangdong province, China and were then introduced in Mexico and Spain from the seaport of Manila, which was where goods from Asia (including various forms of items manufactured in Guangdong) could be exported to Mexico and Europe. These shawls became a popular fashion accessory for women in Spain and Latin America after the year 1821. The demand for these Chinese shawls grew so much that it led to an increase in production from Chinese factories; and simultaneously, local embroiderers from Spain started to embroider their own. Despite the emerging local production in Spain, a large amount of Manila shawls continued to be manufactured in China for the sole purpose of the export market. The popularity of these shawls (which were actually still being produced in China) in the 19th century Europe eventually resulted in the adoption of the Chinese shawls in the traditional Spanish clothing attire. With time and through various form cultural exchanges with other cultures, the Spanish shawls developed into its current style through the exposure and interaction of different cultures.

=== Chinese shoes ===
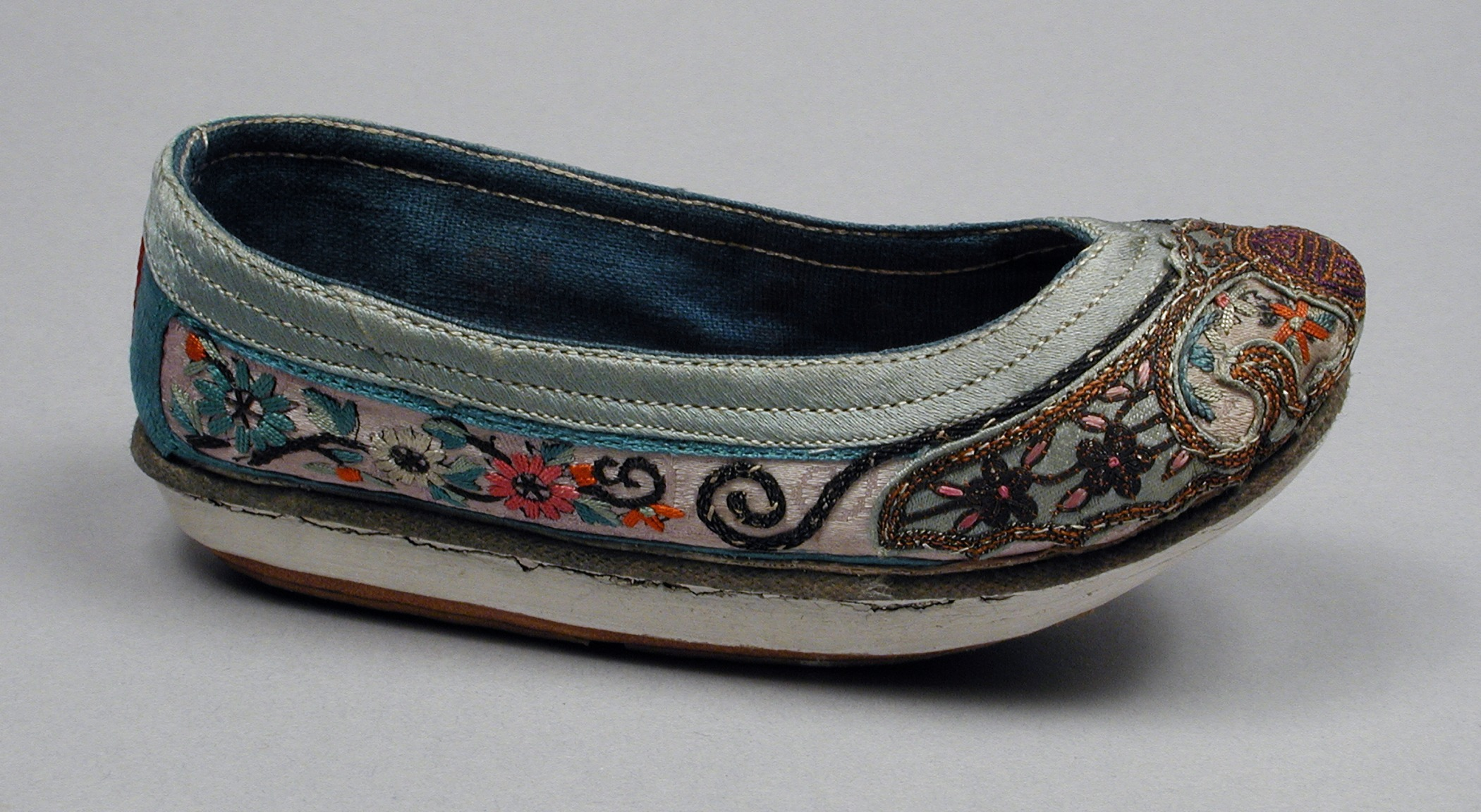
Example of a Chinese slippers, Qing dynasty.

Chinese shoes have influenced the design of European slippers with turned-up toes and with small low heels of the late 1880s.

In the early 20th century, Chinese slippers, which were manufactured in China for American trade, were exported and sold in American stores; however, the fine grade Chinese slippers were never sold to Chinese people in America instead they were sold to American women as boudoir shoes.On the other hand, local Chinese shoe companies in America would mainly sell shoes to Chinese people.

== Controversies ==
=== Lack of fashion myth, Western Imperialism, and Orientalism ===
Though Chinese fashions had a global influence, the Chinese themselves were still perceived as being fashion-less when they did not fit the criteria of fashionable modernity. Europeans had visited imperial China since the 1500s at the times of the Ming dynasty and the difference of fashion was one of the first thing that they noticed. "Clothing never changed in China" became a myth constructed by early European writers and foreign sojourners who visited Imperial China but lacked knowledge on Chinese fashion of the previous decades. European writers at least since the 18th century, such as Jean-Baptiste Du Halde, Fernand Braudel, had held opinions that China had a static fashion. However, the descriptions of Chinese fashion by Europeans from the 16th to the 18th centuries were mainly based on their perceptions of the Chinese clothing that they saw, instead of describing Chinese garments itself.

In the 18th century, Jean-Baptiste Du Halde, for example, had identified fashion as being a key difference between Europe and ancient China is the lack of changing fashion in China in his publications:

As for what is here called Fashion, it has nothing at all in it like what we call so in Europe, where the manner of Dress is subject to many changes

— Jean-Baptiste du Halde, French Jesuit Historian

Du Halde's claims of the static fashion of China was later circulated along with his publications and consolidated the belief that Chinese people dressed in fashion-less robes in the imagination of the Europeans. Ironically, Du Halde actually never went to Imperial China; however, to strengthen the veracity of his claims, Du Halde paired these images of engravings of Chinese with exhaustive descriptions of Chinese customs and relied on the accounts of other Jesuit missionaries. Similar accounts continued to appear at different point of time. Western Imperialism also often accompanied Orientalism, and European imperialism was especially at its highest in the 19th century. In the 19th century time, Europeans described China in binary opposition to Europe, describing China as "lacking in fashion" among many other things, while Europeans deliberately placed themselves in a superior position when they would compare themselves to the Chinese as well as to other countries in Asia:

Latent orientalism is an unconscious, untouchable certainty about what the Orient is, static and unanimous, separate, eccentric, backward, silently different, sensual, and passive. It has a tendency towards despotism and away from progress. [...] Its progress and value are judged in comparison to the West, so it is the Other. Many rigorous scholars [...] saw the Orient as a locale requiring Western attention, reconstruction, even redemption.

— Laura Fantone quoted Said (1979), Local Invisibility, Postcolonial Feminisms Asian American Contemporary Artists in California, page 166

Works by Europeans writers which were influenced by Orientalist ideas would depict China as lacking fashion and by extension construct China as a static and unchanging nation. Compared to the Chinese, the Europeans would therefore describe themselves as "not superstitious, backwards, unhygienic, effeminate, or slavish". Foot binding, in particular, fuelled the imaginations of the Europeans and the Americans who perceived China as being "a mysterious, exotic, and barbaric Orient" where bound feet of the Chinese women became a representative of the "Chinese barbarity" and as signs of female oppression. Similar ideas were also applied to other countries in the East Asia, in India, and Middle East, where the perceived lack of fashion were associated with offensive remarks on the Asian social and political systems:

I confess that the unchanging fashions of the Turks and other Eastern peoples do not attract me. It seems that their fashions tend to preserve their stupid despotism.

— Jean Baptiste Say (1829)

=== Accusation of cultural appropriation and plagiarism ===
2022

1. Mamianqun and new Dior skirt from fall 2022 collection: In July 2022, Dior first was accused of cultural appropriation and design plagiarism of the traditional Han Chinese skirt, mamianqun.
2. Dior was accused of cultural appropriation for a second time in July 2022 for due to its usage of pattern print which looks like the huaniaotu (Chinese: 花鳥圖; lit. 'bird-and-flower painting'), into its 2022 autumn and winter ready-to-wear collection and has been introduced as being Dior's signature motif Jardin d'Hiver which was inspired by Christian Dior's wall murals. The huaniaotu is a traditional Chinese painting theme which belong to the Chinese scholar-artist style in Chinese painting and originated in the Tang dynasty.

== Related content ==
- Korea: Chinese influences on Korean clothing
- Japan: Kimono, Ryusou

== See also ==
- Fashion
- Chinese clothing: Hanfu, Qizhuang, cheongsam
- Major historical events in Chinese fashion history: Tifayifu; Hanfu Movement

== Gallery ==
Chinoiserie fashion

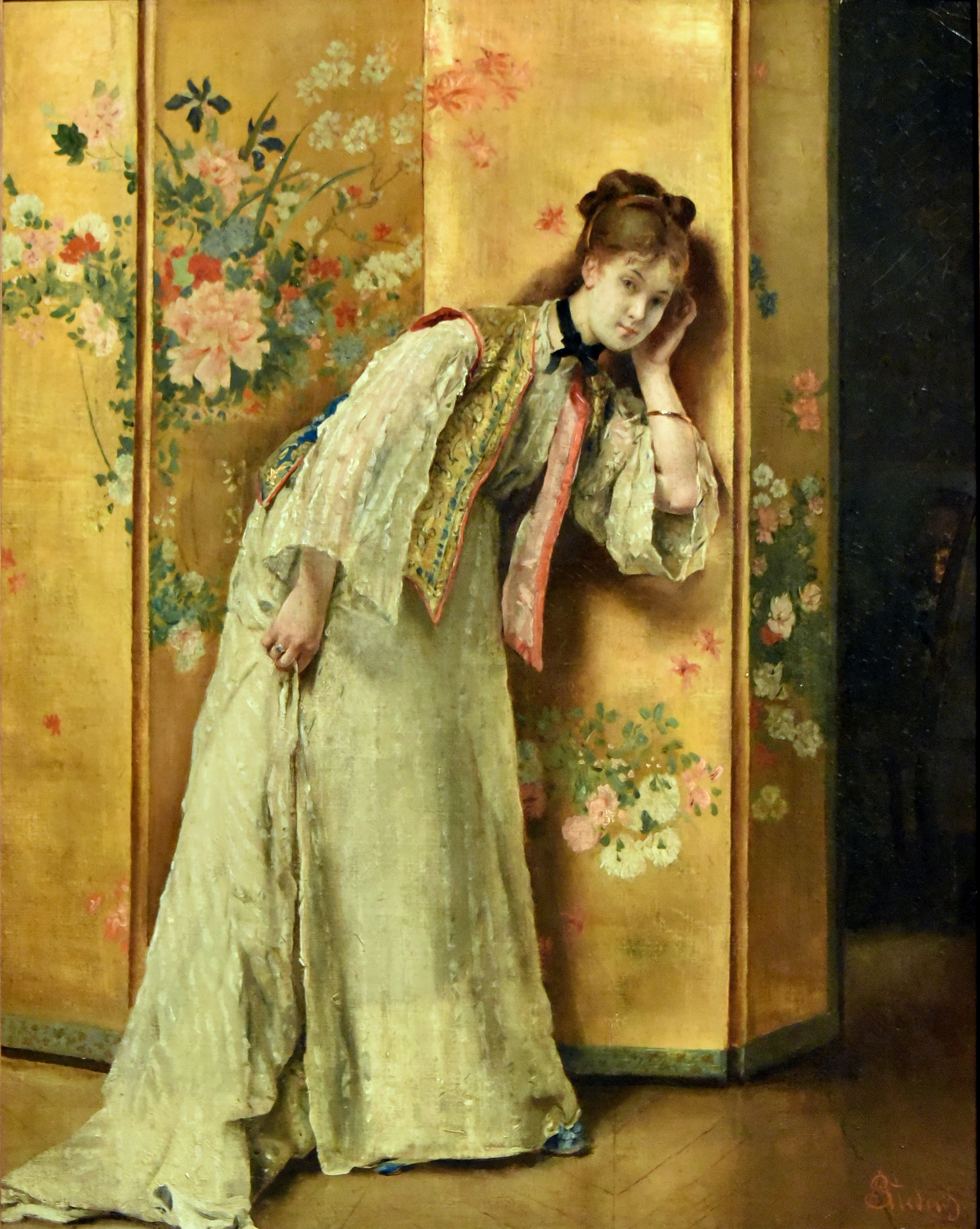

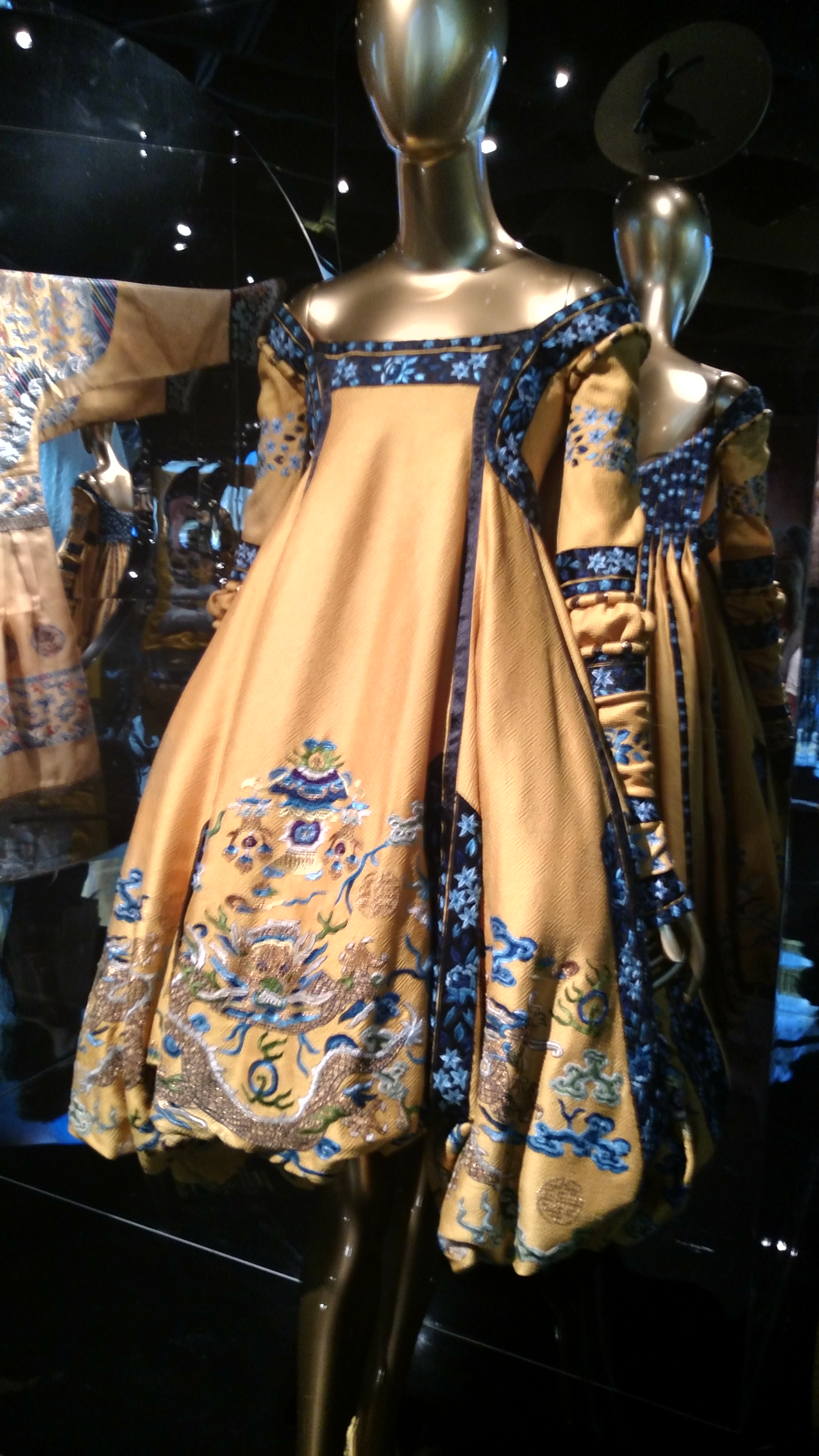

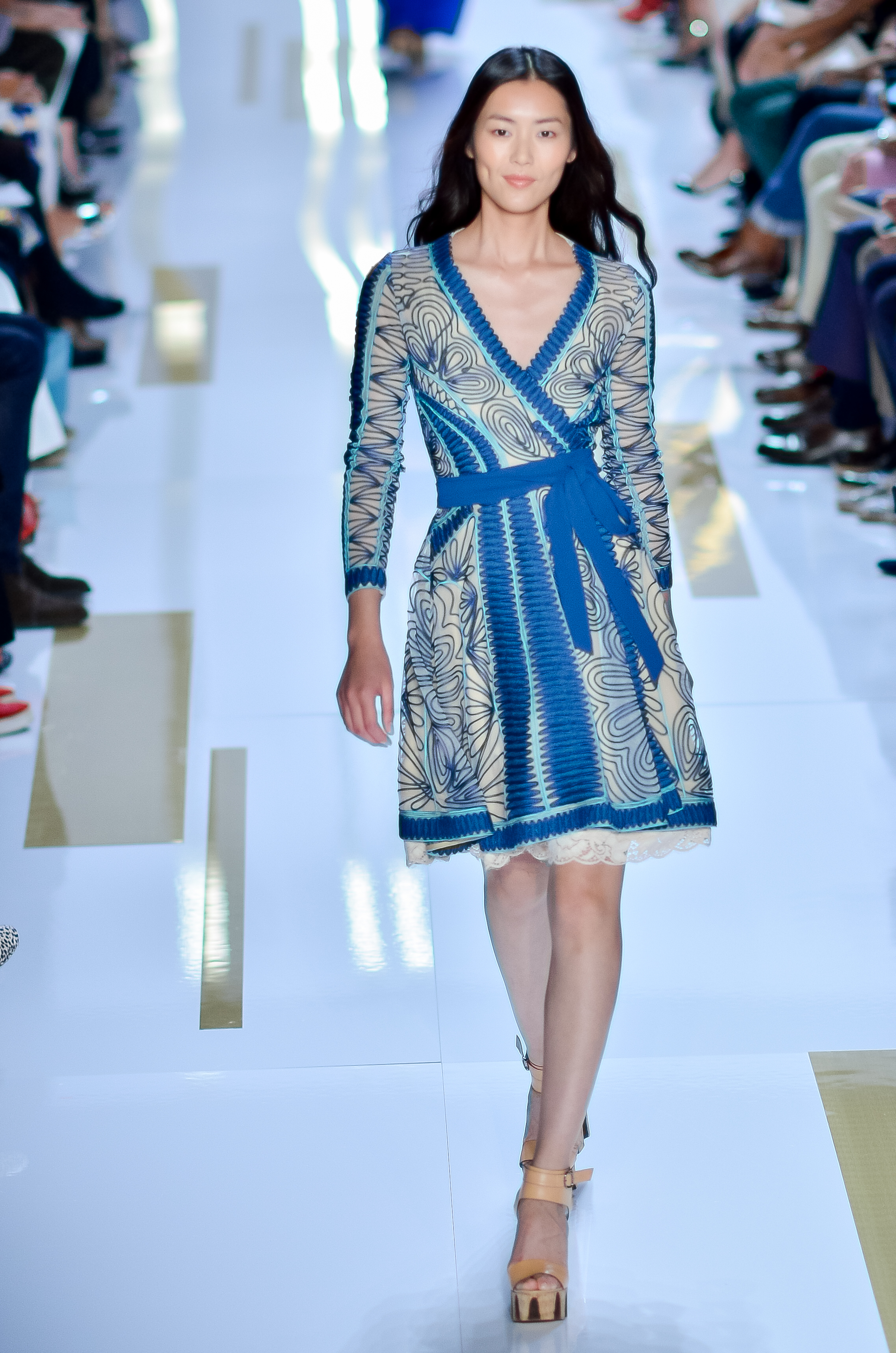
Wrap dress

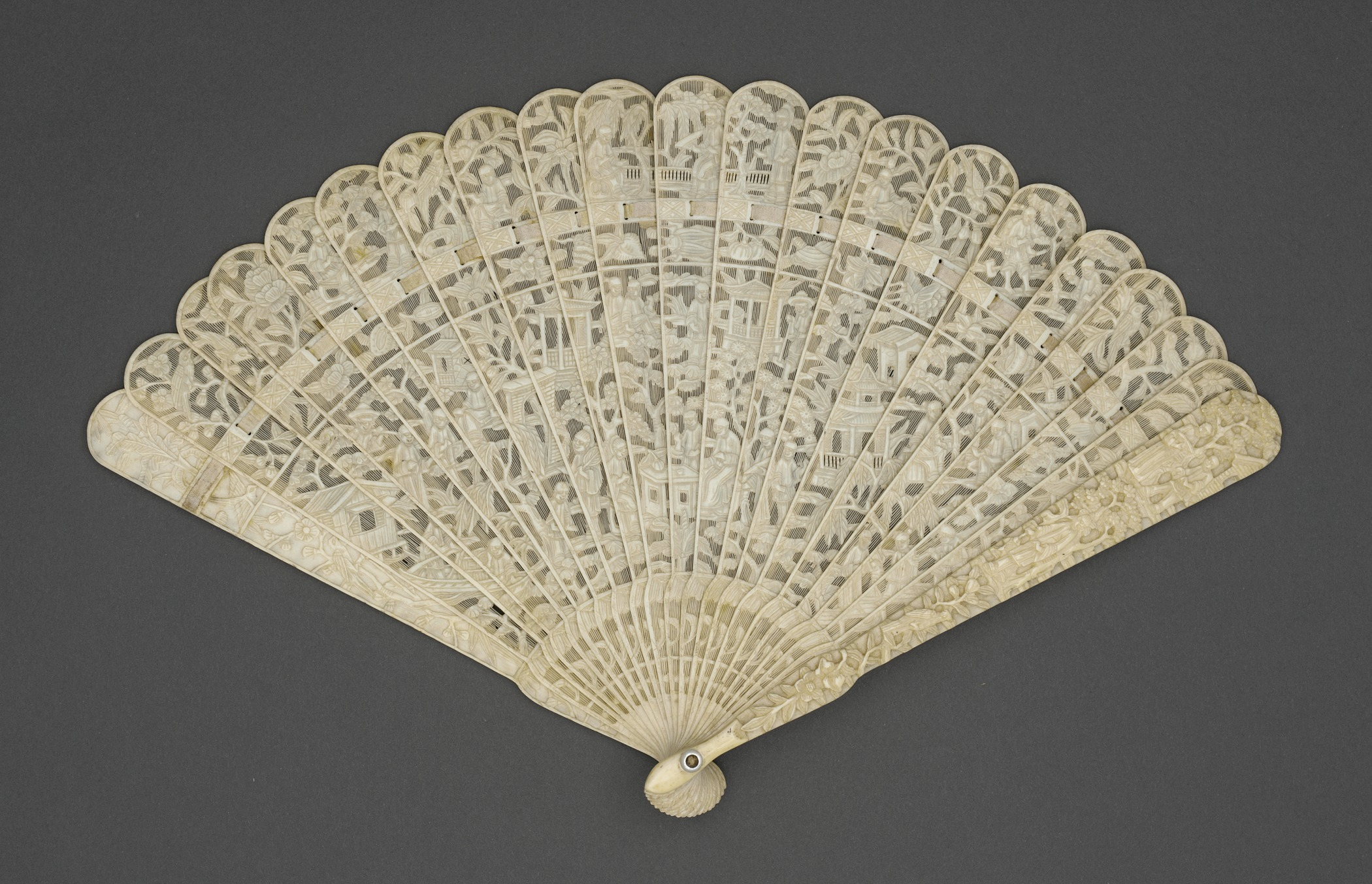
Brisé fan, China, c.1800
Sources of inspiration and materials in chinoiserie fashion

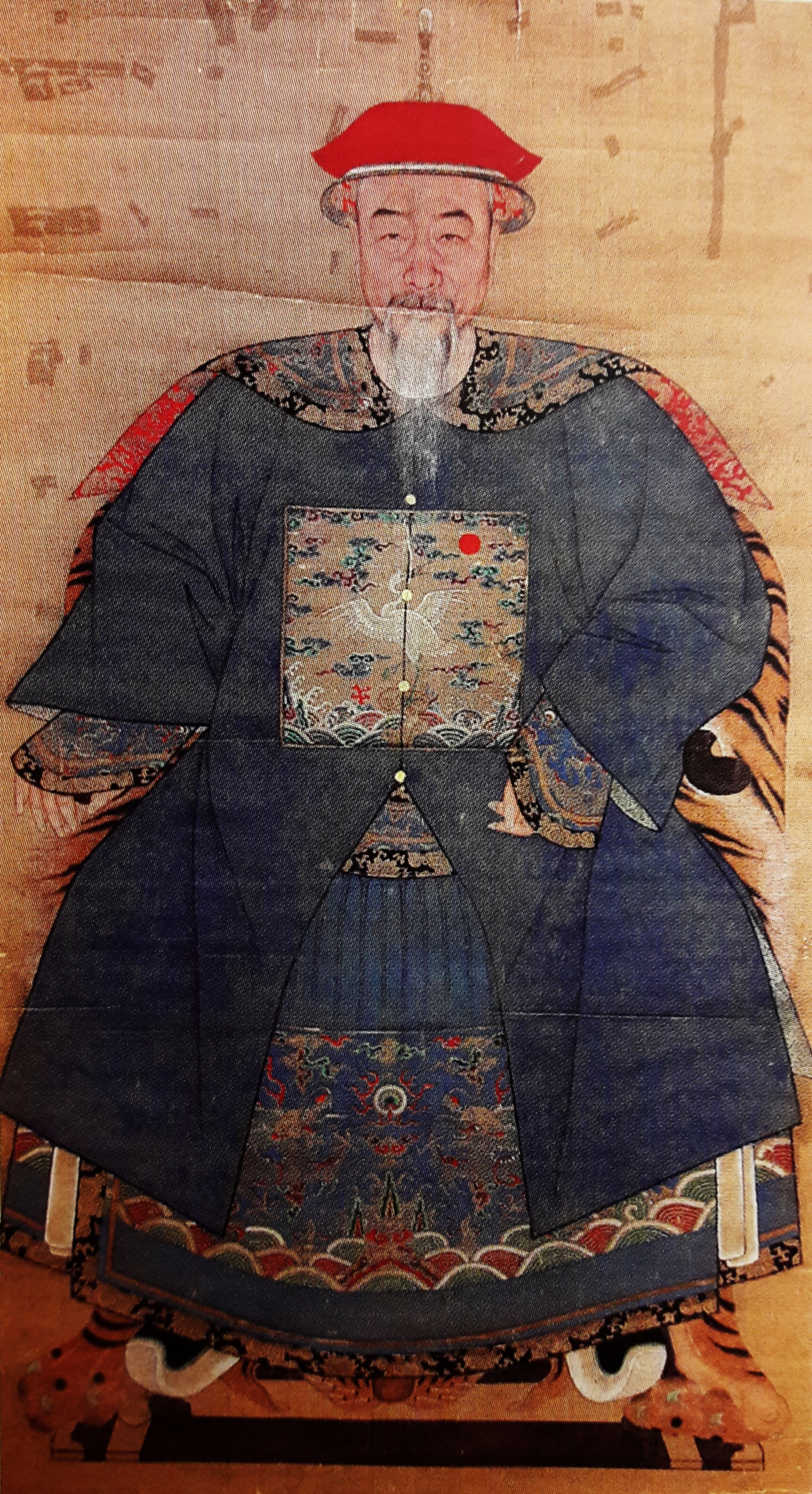
A bufu, a mandarin court robe, with piling over the shoulders, Civil official of Qing dynasty, mid-18th century

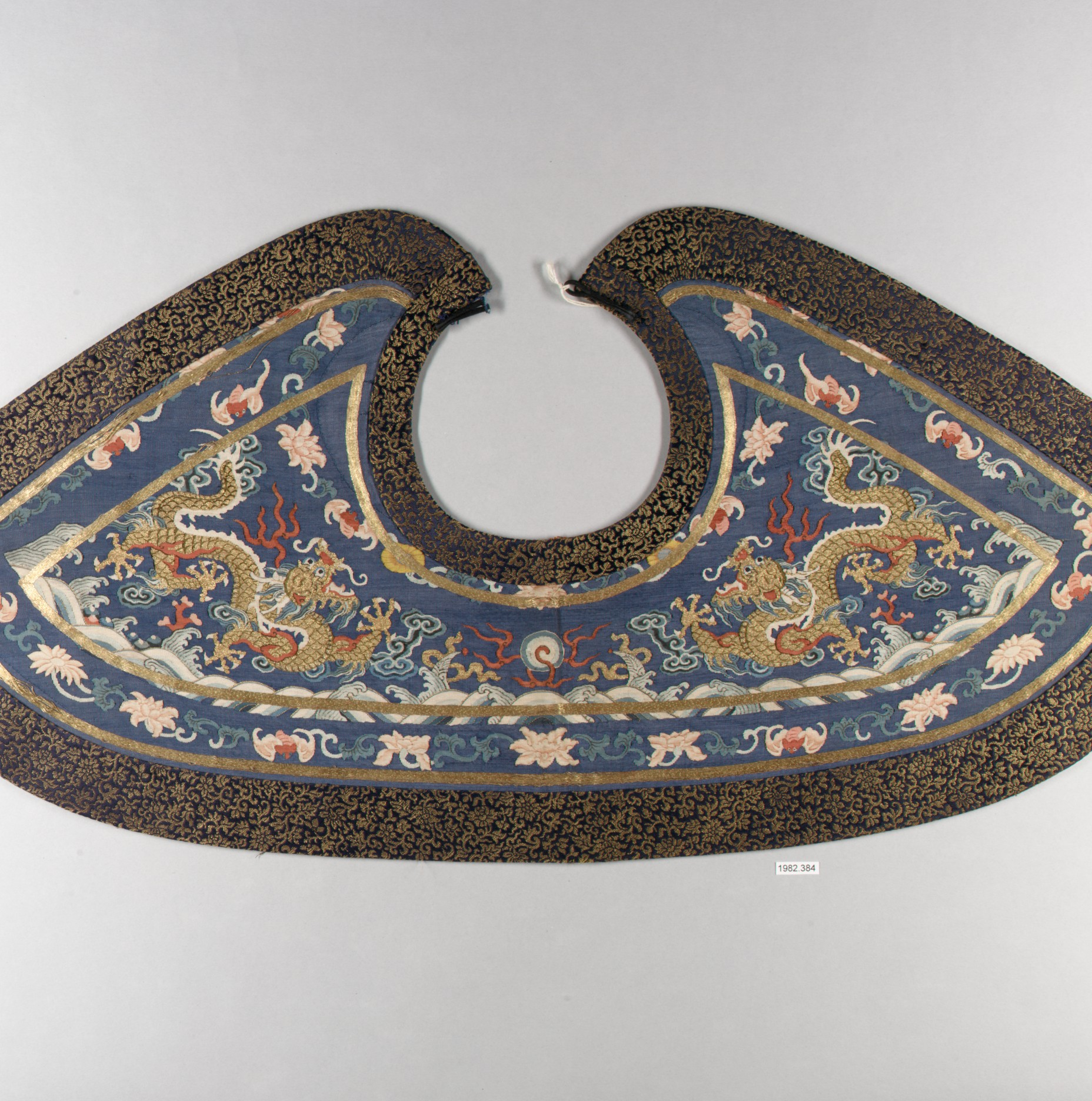
Piling collar, worn in the court robe of the Qing dynasty

Inaccurate depiction of a lady in China, from the book "A collection of the dresses of different nations, ancient and modern", 1700, Qing dynasty period

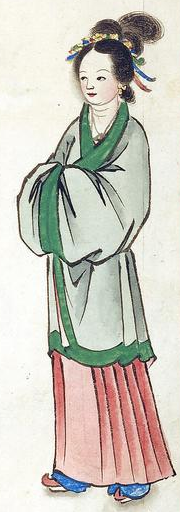
Jiaoling youren yi with mamianqun with pleats, Hanfu, from the Boxer Codex, 1500

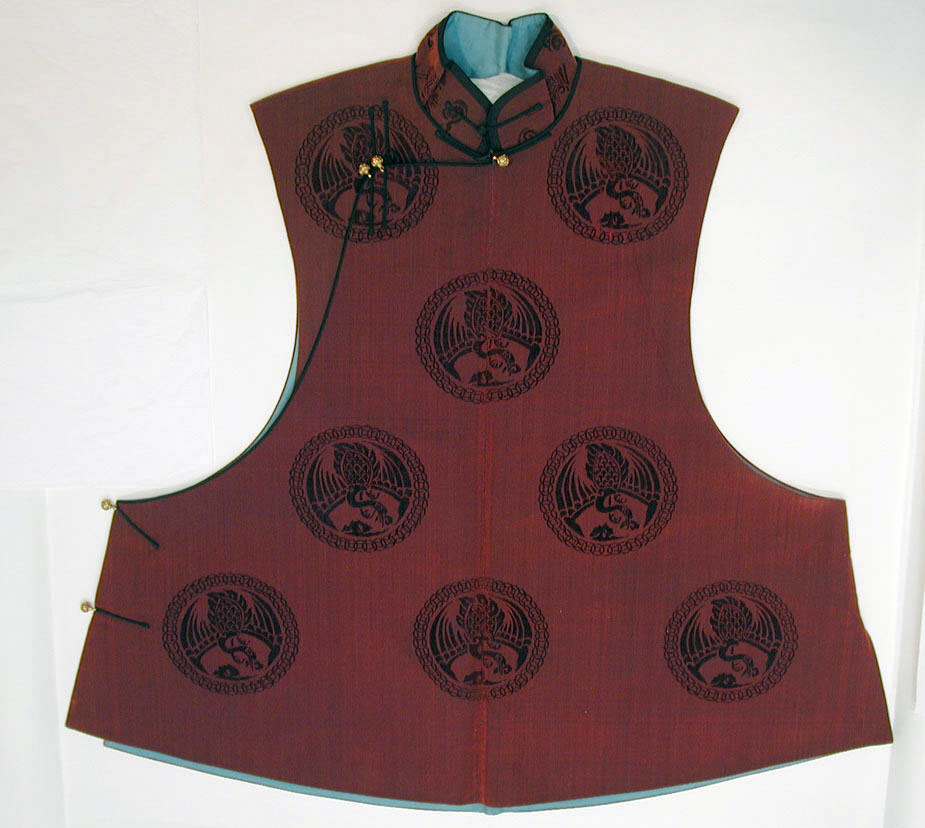
A style of kanjia/ majia, a traditional vest, Qing dynasty, 19th century

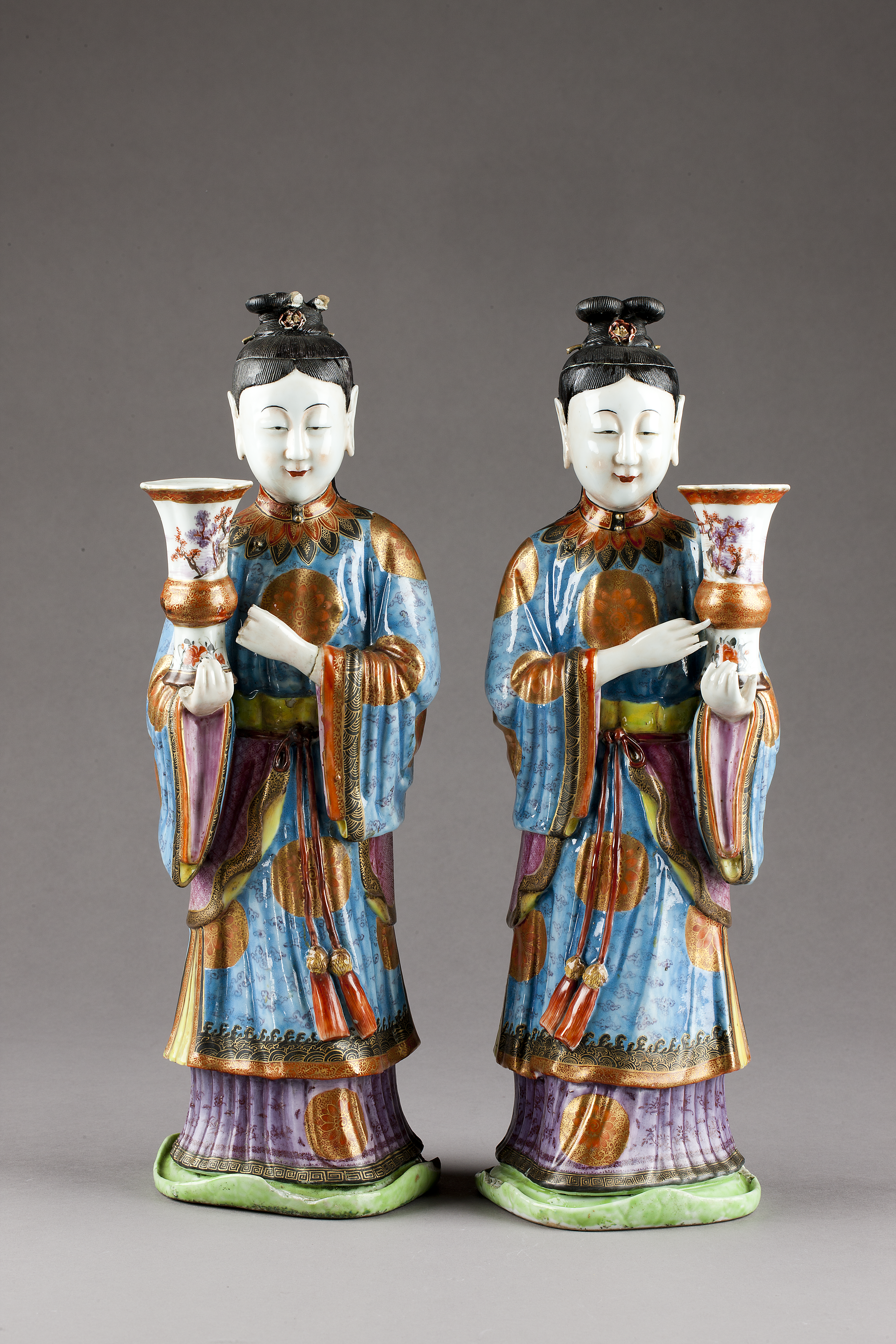
Chang'ao and mamianqun with pleats, sash, and yunjian (collar), a popular style of Hanfu in the Ming to Qing dynasty, 18th century.

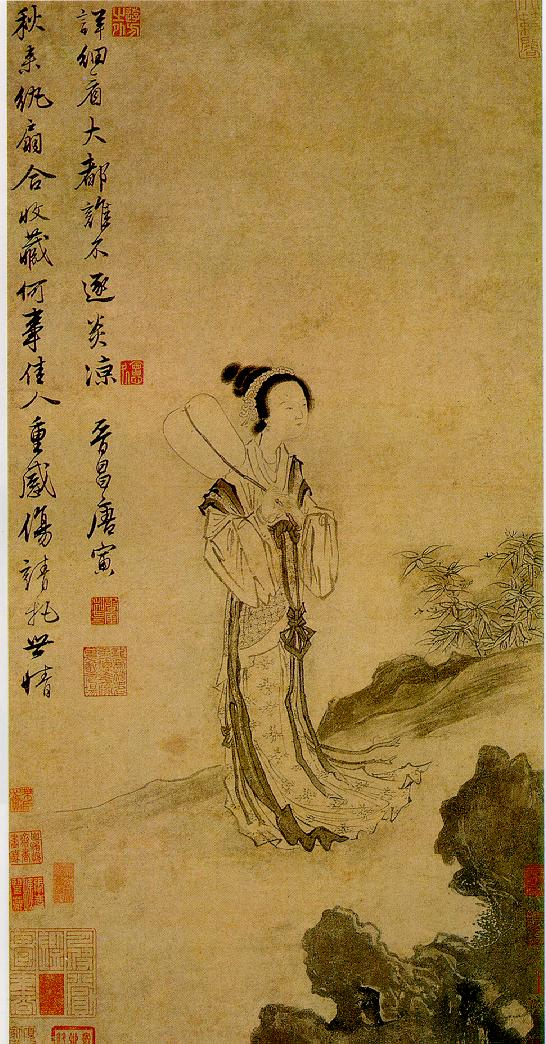
Ruqun with yaoqun and traditional Lào zi (decorative Chinese knot), Hanfu

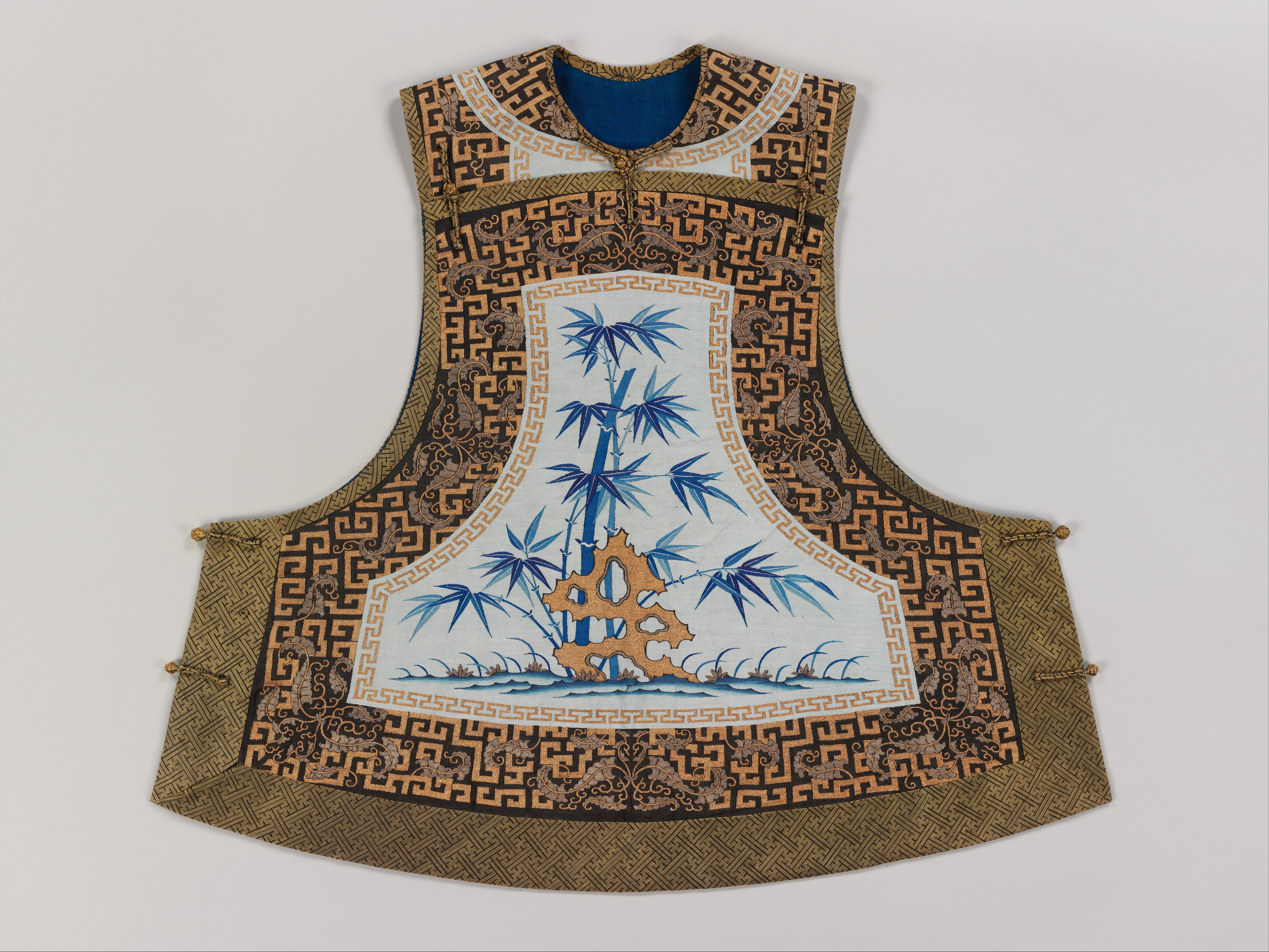
A style of kanjia/ majia, a traditional vest, Qing dynasty, 19th century

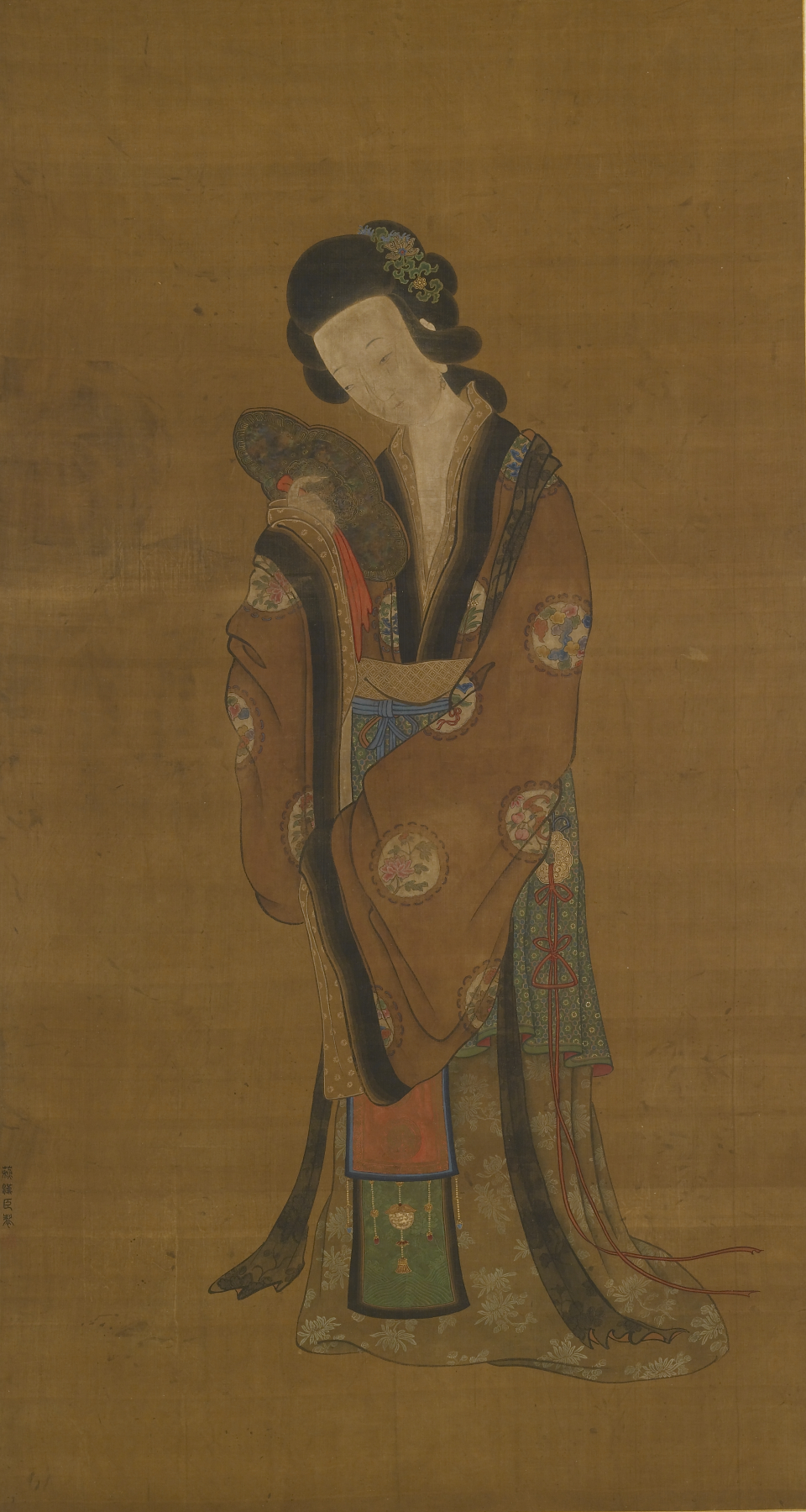
Ruqun, Hanfu, Qing dynasty, 18th century.

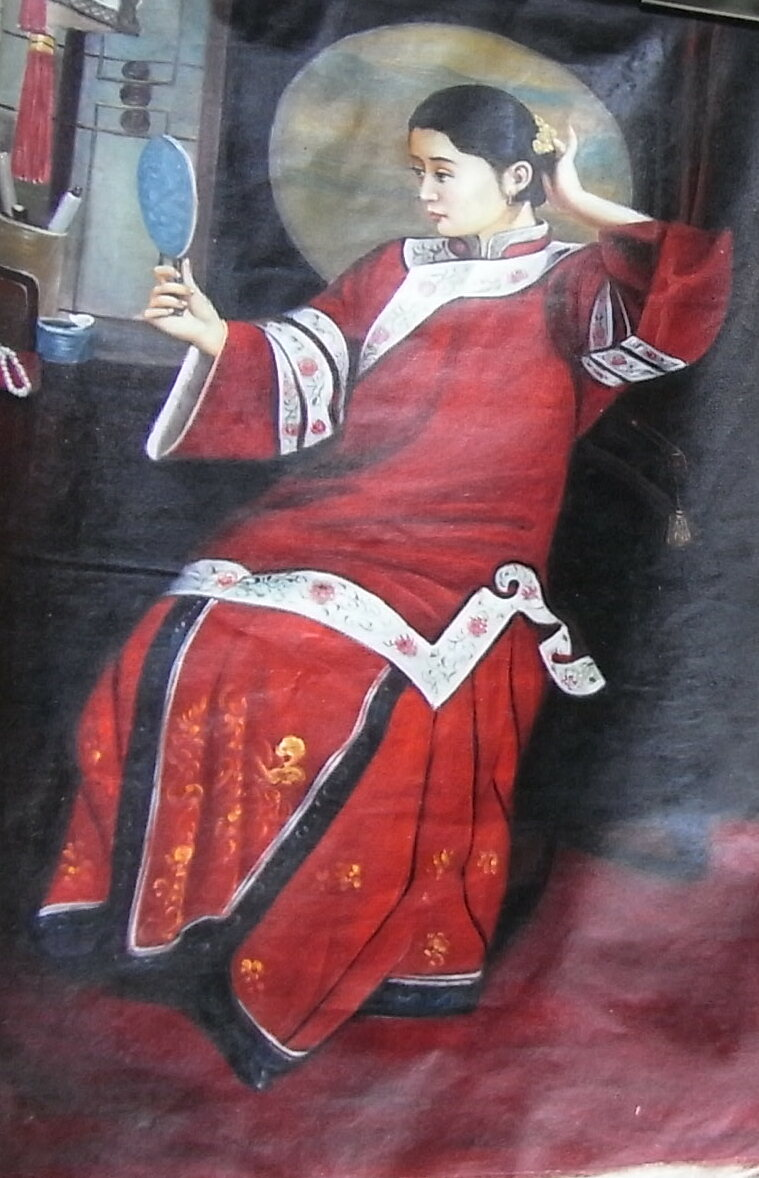
Qing dynasty-style aoqun, consisting of ao and mamianqun with gore, traditional Hanfu.

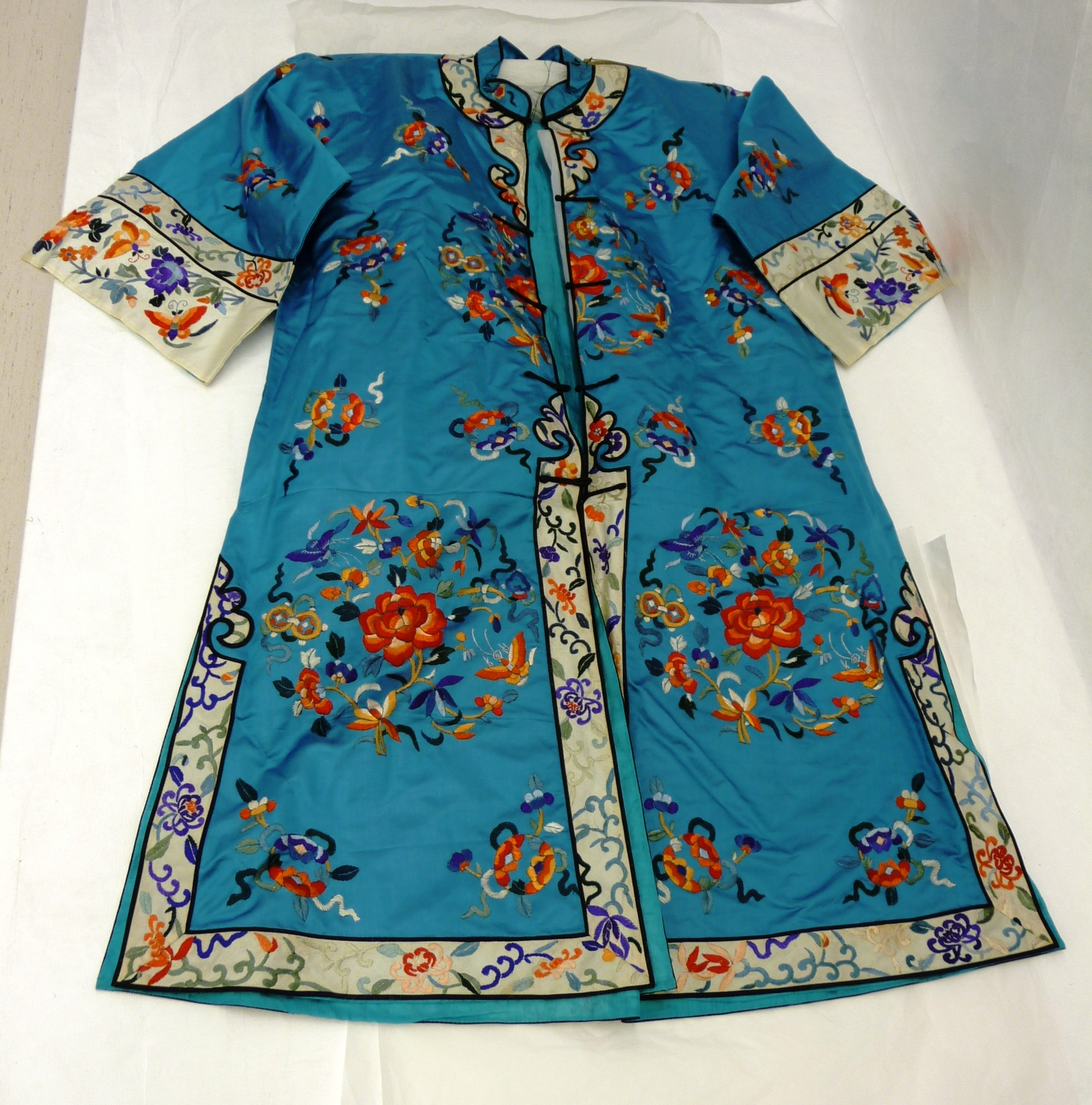
Example of gua jacket worn by Chinese women, Qing dynasty

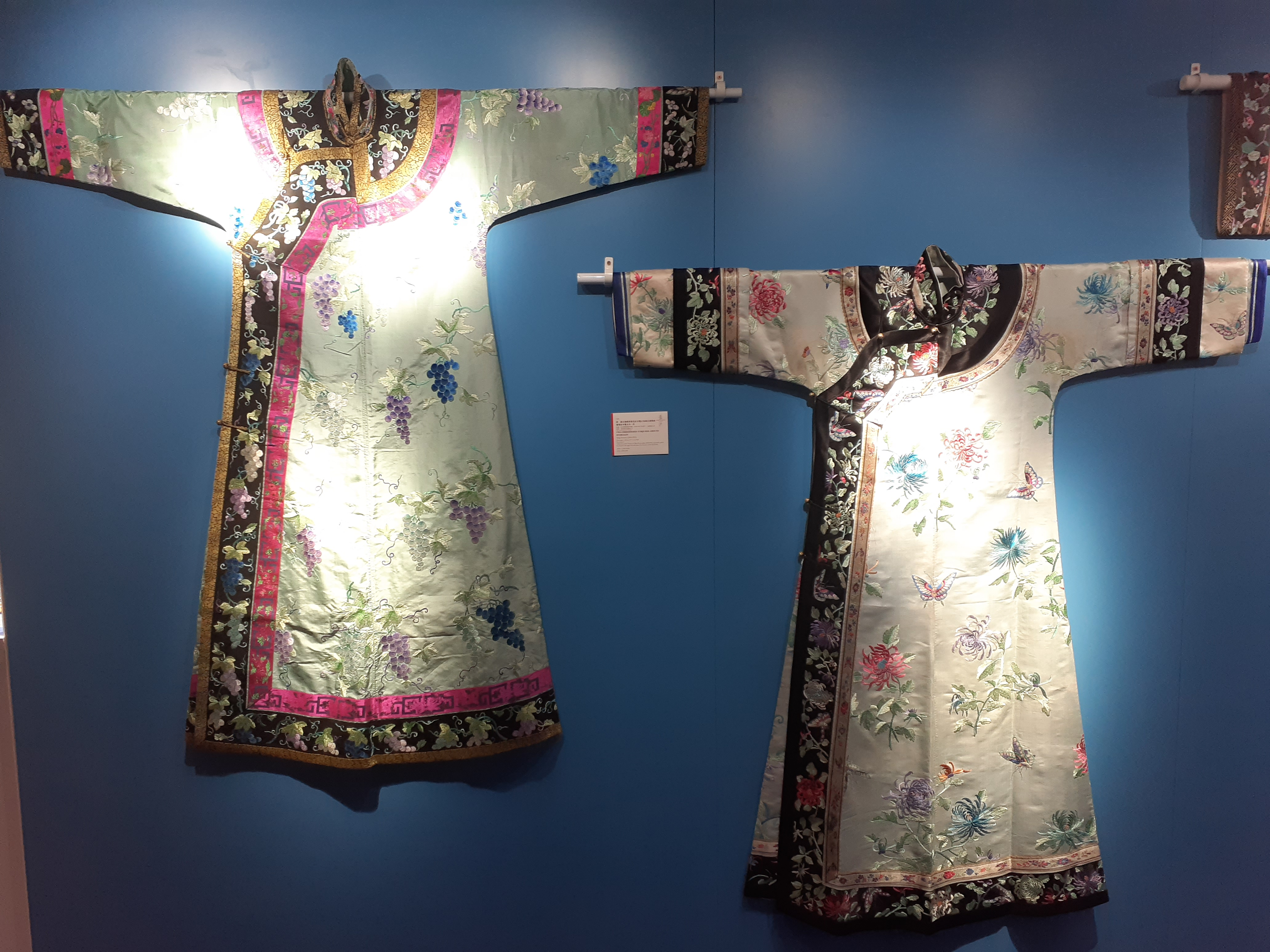
Chenyi, Manchu women robe, Qing dynasty

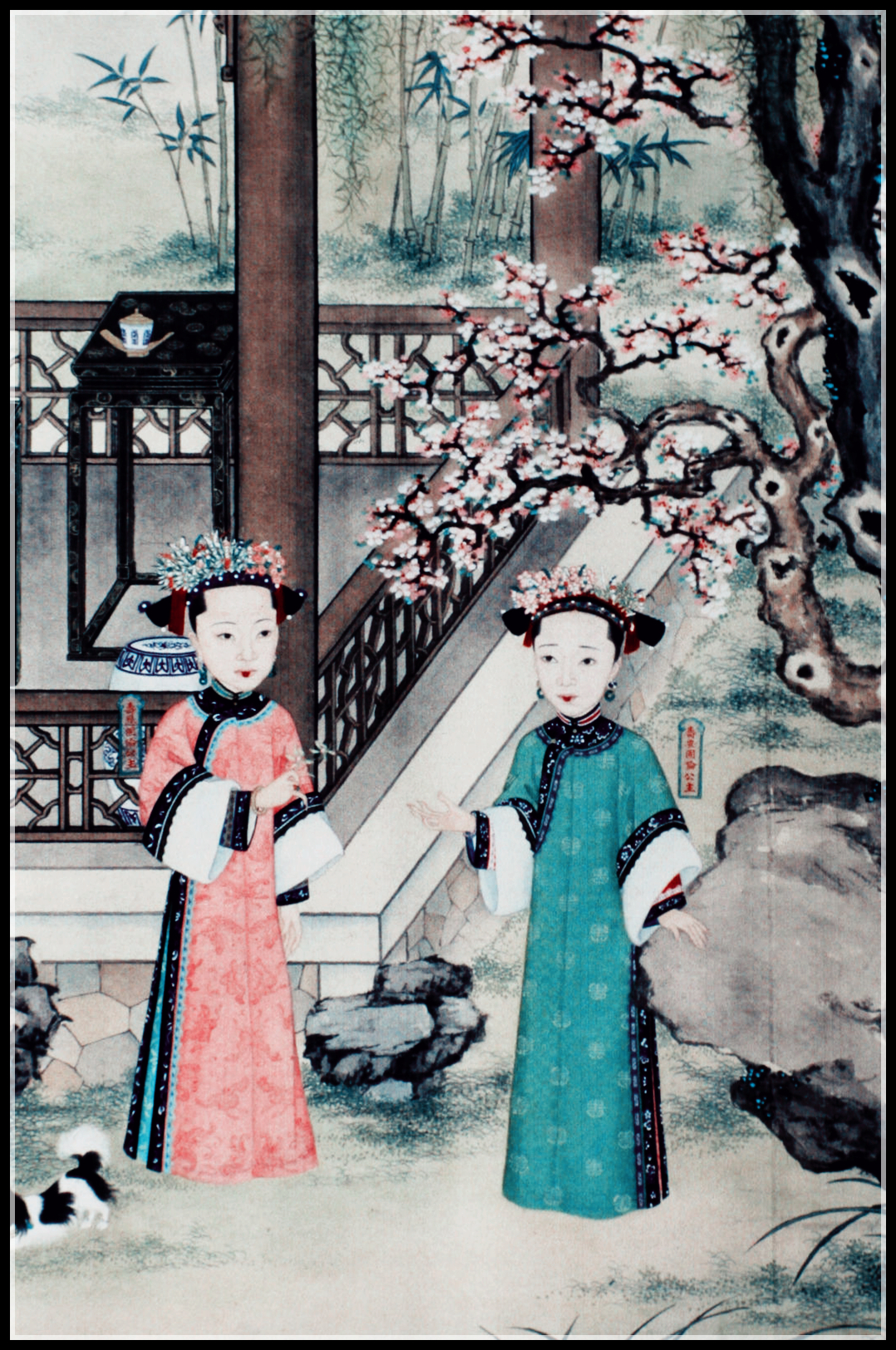
Changyi,Manchu women robe, Qing dynasty

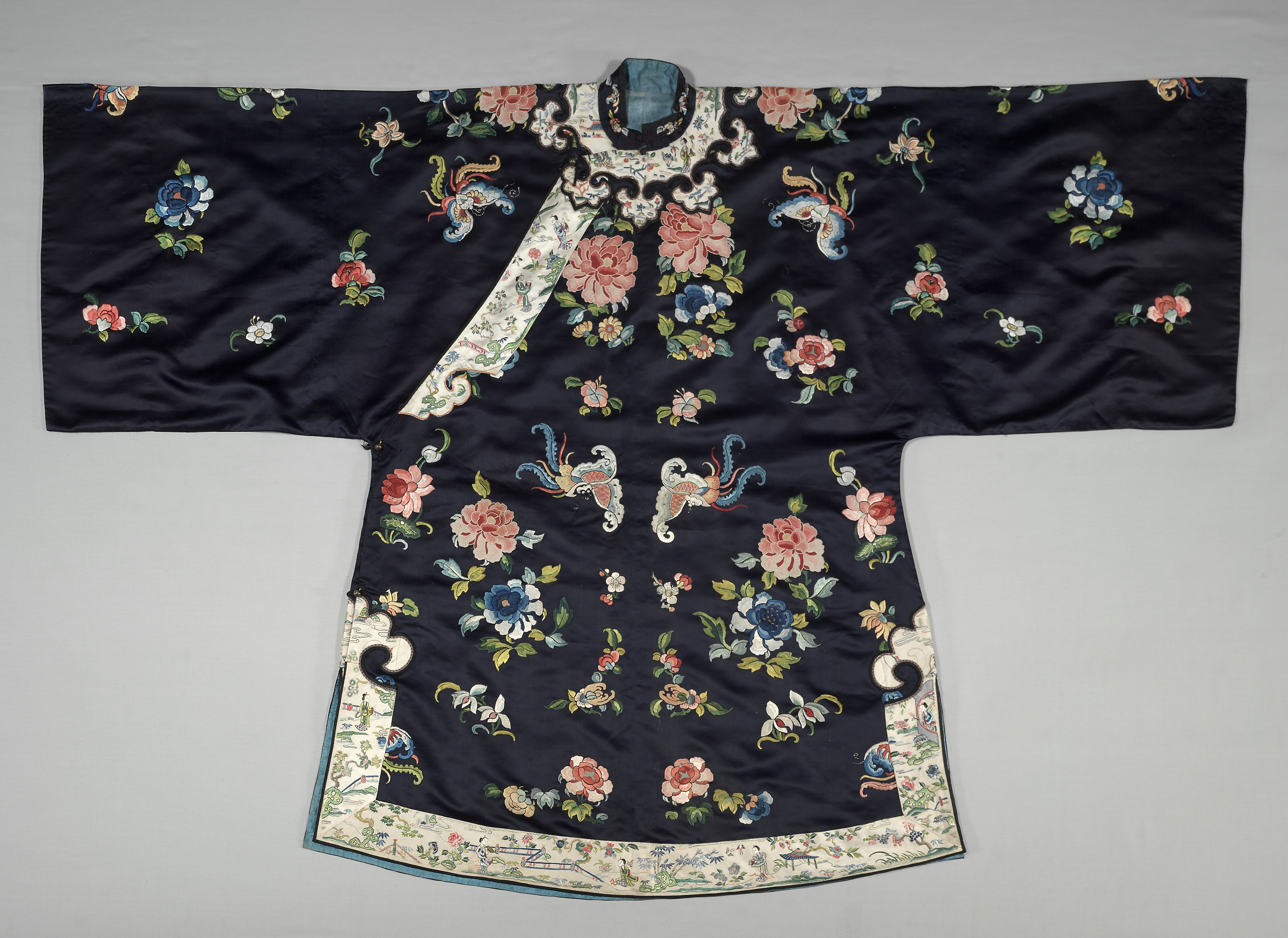
Han Chinese women's ao with integrated yunjian appliqué at the collar, Qing dynasty, late 19th century

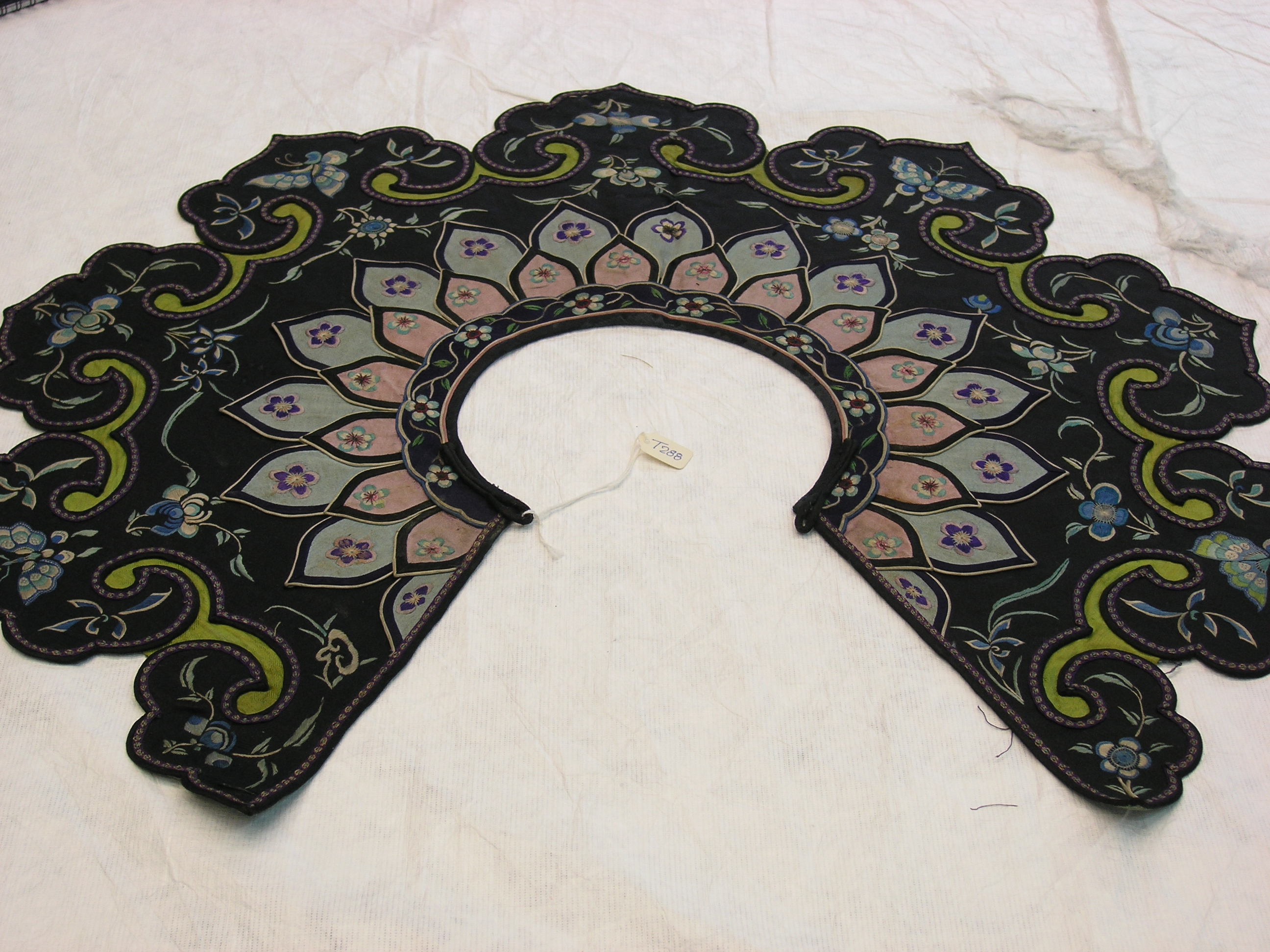
Yunjian, a collar used by Han Chinese women, Qing dynasty

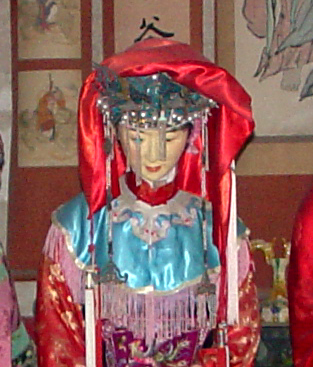
Restoration of a blue Yunjian embellished with fringes as part of the traditional Chinese wedding of the 19th century, Folk Customs Museum, Luoyang, China

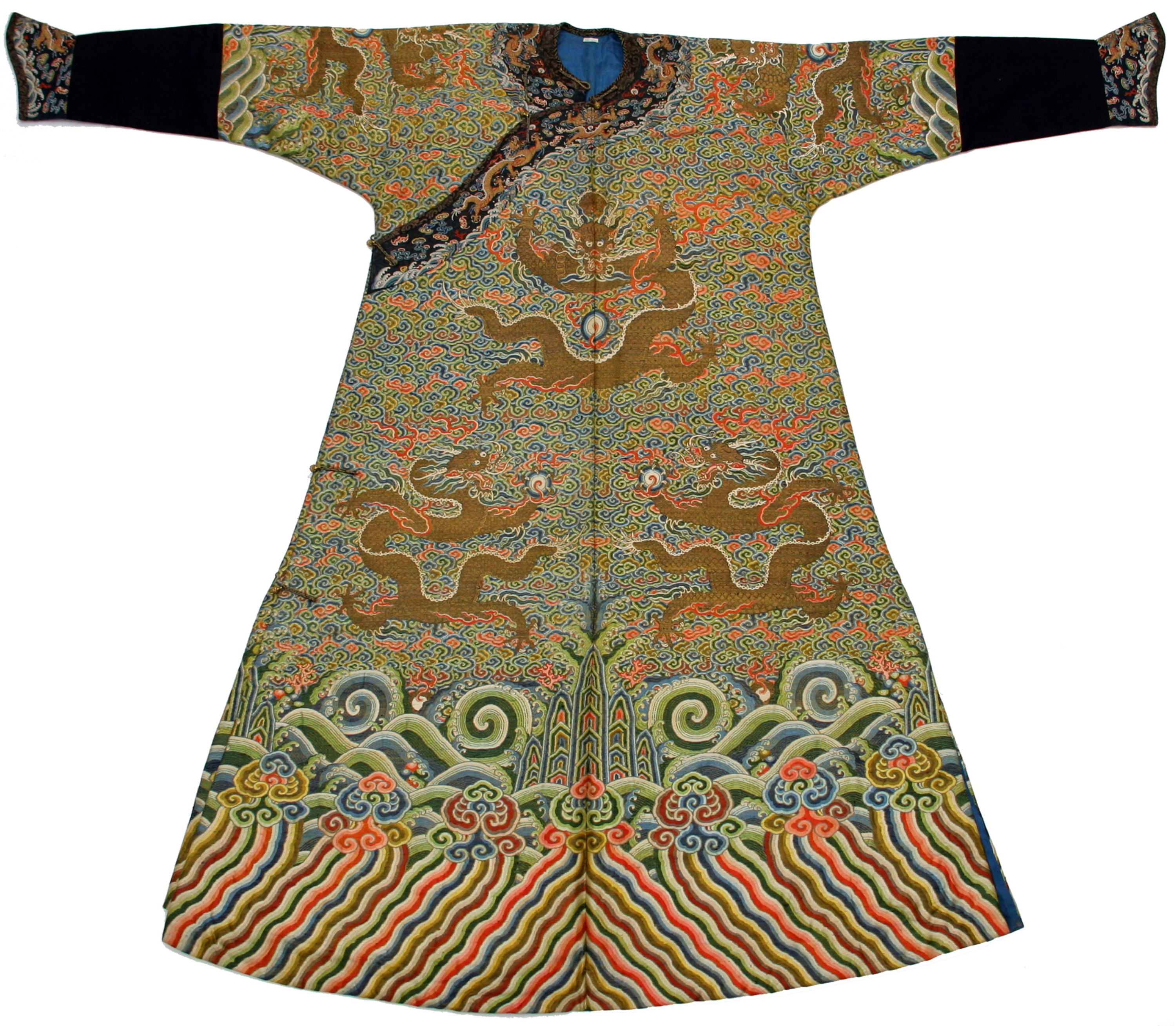
Imperial dragon robes, Qing dynasty

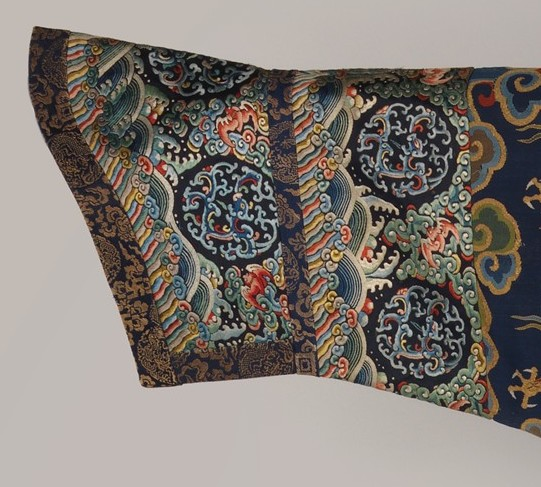
Manchu's Horsehoofs cuffs decorated with xiangyun, lishui, woshui, floral medaillon, and hongfu (red bats).

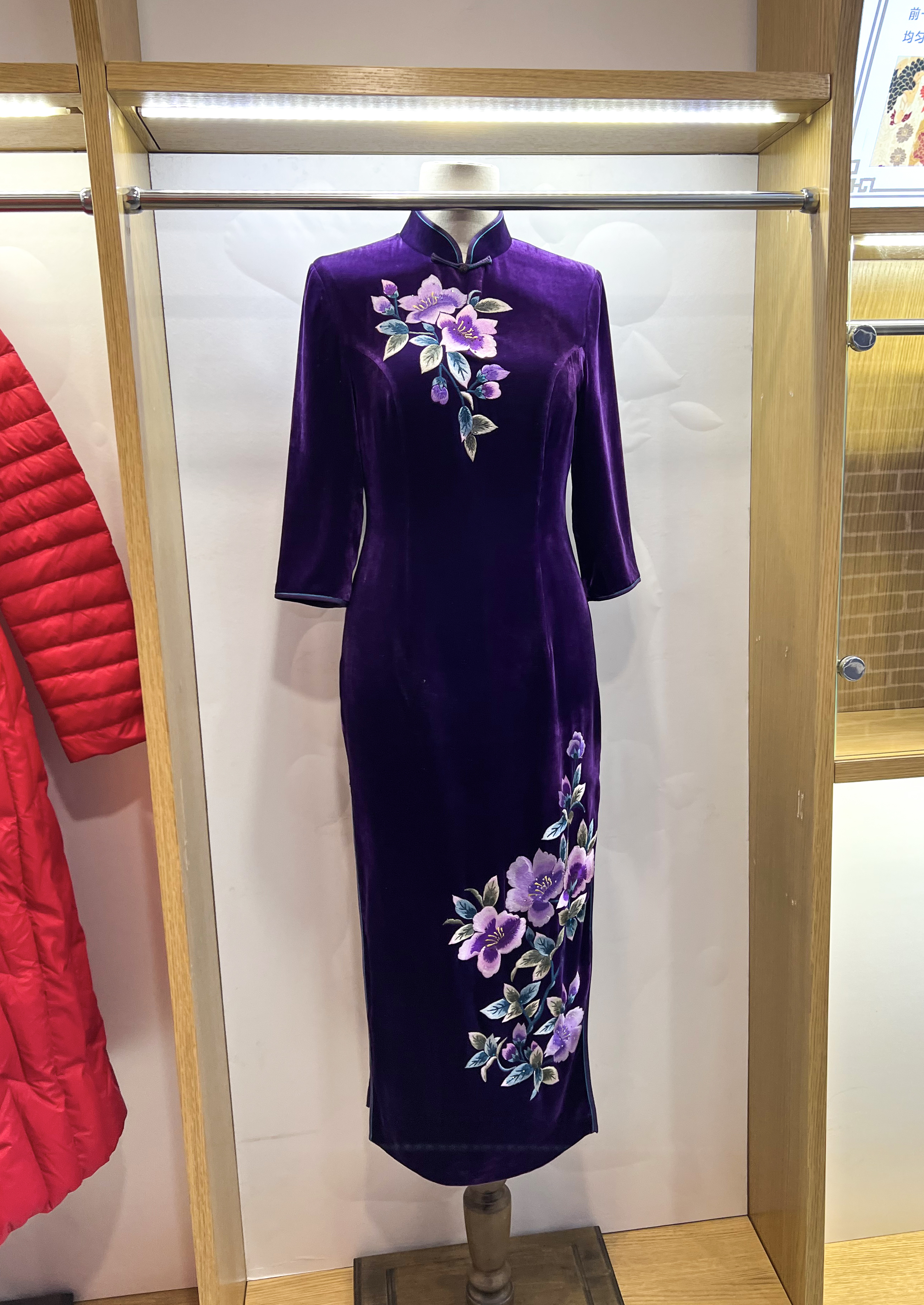
A style of Chinese Cheongsam
