= Jean-Baptiste Du Halde =

French Jesuit historian specializing in China (1674–1743)

- Born: February 1, 1674; Paris, France
- Died: August 18, 1743 (aged 69); Paris, France
- Citizenship: French
- Scientific career
- Fields: History

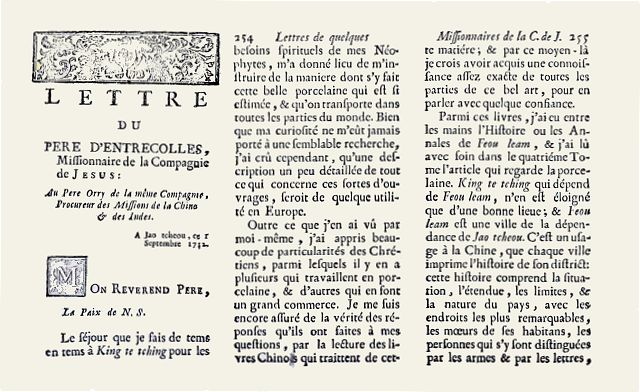
Part of the 1712 letter from Francois Xavier d'Entrecolles, re-published by Jean-Baptiste du Halde in 1735.

Jean-Baptiste Du Halde (Chinese: 杜赫德, Pinyin: Dù Hèdé; 1 February 1674 – 18 August 1743) was a French Jesuit historian specializing in China. He did not travel to China, but collected seventeen Jesuit missionaries' reports and provided an encyclopedic survey of the history, culture and society of China and "Chinese Tartary," that is, Manchuria.

Voltaire said of Du Halde's work: "Although it is developed out of Paris, and he hath not known the Chinese, [he] gave on the basis of the memoirs of his colleagues, the widest and the best description the empire of China has had worldwide."

== Career ==
Du Halde entered the Society of Jesus in 1692 and became professor at the College of Paris succeeding Charles Le Gobien. From 1711 to 1743 he oversaw the publication of Lettres Édifiantes et Curieuses, written from Foreign Missions, by Jesuit missionaries in China, published in 34 volumes ranges between 1703 and 1776. He wrote prefaces for volumes IX to XXVI. He was also Secretary of Michel Le Tellier and confessor to the son of the regent in 1729.

Du Halde is also the author of writings in Latin as well as a treatise entitled Le Sage chrétien, ou les Principes de la vraie sagesse, pour se conduire chrétiennement dans le monde (The Christian Sage, or the principles of true wisdom, to lead a Christian in the world), published in 1724.

== Description of China ==
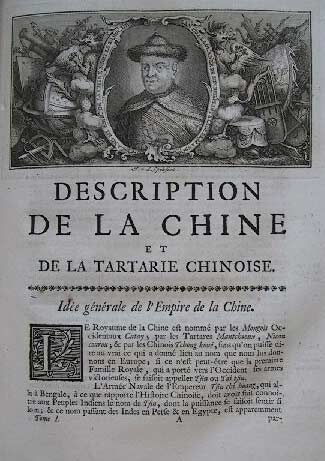
Description de la Chine, by Jean-Baptiste Du Halde, 1736.

Drawn from the Jesuit Lettres Édifiantes et Curieuses and unpublished reports containing translations of Chinese texts of various origins, Du Halde's Geographical, Historical, Chronological, Political, and Physical Description of the Empire of China and Chinese Tartary appeared in Paris in four volumes in 1735; it was reprinted in the Netherlands the next year and translated into English as The General History of China two years after that. Besides a very detailed geographical description based on work by the Jesuits, the book gave encyclopedic coverage of all aspects of Chinese civilization: the emperors and the government; the military and police institutions; the nobility; agriculture and handicrafts; the "genius," "glory", and appearance of Chinese religion, ethics and ceremonies; science and medicine; money and commerce; the language and writing system; the production of porcelain and silkworm breeding. Its understandings of Chinese religion and philosophy were informed by the translations published in 1711 at Prague by the Jesuit François Noël, whose lack of the earlier Christian interpolations in the Chinese text had caused them to be banned in the Papal States and the Holy Roman Empire. There is also an abstract of the explorations of Vitus Bering, which was the first European description of Alaska. The book was very quickly added to all academic libraries and has translated into most European languages.

It had a significant impact on European society in the 18th century, including a decades-long English interest in China and Chinese thought. The philosophers of the Enlightenment drew on it for their thoughts and controversies about religions, cultures and customs, while European manufacturers discovered the secrets of Chinese geography and the first map of the Korea by Jean-Baptiste Régis and 42 maps of Chinese provinces by Jean Baptiste Bourguignon d'Anville.

== See also ==
- Jesuit China missions
