= Patouillet =

Patouillet is a surname. Notable people with the surname include:

- Leland D. Patouillet, former director of the University of Florida Alumni Association
- Marie Patouillet (born 1988), French cyclist
- Mathieu Patouillet (born 2004), French football goalkeeper
