= Jean-Baptiste Geoffroy =

French composer

Jean-Baptiste Geoffroy (1601 in the diocese of Clermont – 30 October 1675 in Paris) was a French composer. He entered the Jesuit order as a novice in 1621 and from 1660 until his death directed the music at the church attached to the Jesuit Professed house of Paris (known today as the Saint-Paul-Saint-Louis church), where Marc-Antoine Charpentier later served.

Besides a few vocal works in manuscript, three publications are known:

- Musicalia varia ad usum ecclesiae (1650, lost)
- Musica sacra ad vesperas aliasque in ecclesia preces for one, two and four voices with organ (1659)
- Musica sacra ad varias ecclesiae preces … pars altera (1661), for four voices, including a Mass recently reedited by the Centre de Musique Baroque de Versailles

== Sources ==
- Nathalie Berton-Blivet, Catalogue du motet imprimé en France (1647-1789). Paris: Société française de musicologie, 2011.
- Laurent Guillo, Pierre I Ballard et Robert III Ballard, imprimeurs du roy pour la musique (Liège and Versailles : 2003).
- Pierre Guillot, Les Jésuites et la musique. Liège: Mardaga, 1991.
- Gaëtan Naulleau, La pratique de la basse continue en France au regard de la Musica Sacra de Jean-Baptiste Geoffroy, Ballard, 1659, 1661, Mémoire de maîtrise, Université de Paris IV-Sorbonne, 1997.
- Henri Rybeyrete, Scriptores provinciæ franciæ Societatis Jesu ab anno 1640 ad annum 1670 collecti ab Henrico Rybeyrete ejusdem societatis, 1670. Manuscript. Vanves, Archives de la Compagnie de Jésus.
- Carlos Sommervogel and Aloys De Backer, Bibliothèque de la Compagnie de Jésus. Bruxelles et Paris: 1890-1900 (9 vol.)
