= Tifayifu =

Qing dynasty forced assimilation policy

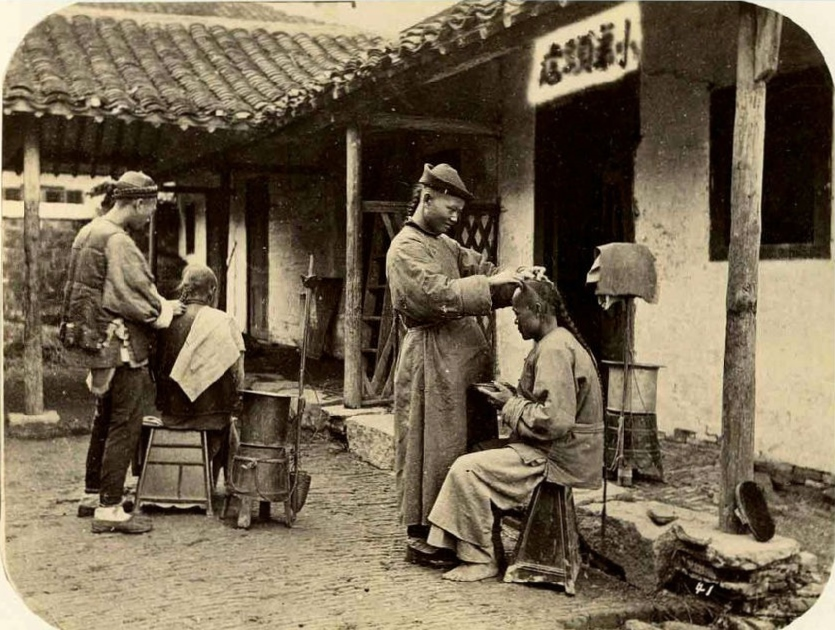
Qing dynasty barbers shaving hair, circa 1870s

Tifayifu (simplified Chinese: 剃发易服; traditional Chinese: 剃髮易服; lit. 'shaving hair and changing clothing') was a forced assimilation policy of the early Qing dynasty enacted in 1645 as Qing conquered China following the collapse of the preceding Ming dynasty. The edict forced Han Chinese, under the threat of massacres, to adopt the Manchu hairstyle (queue) and clothing (qizhuang), abolishing the millennia-long traditional Chinese clothing known as hanfu.

Tifayifu has had a profound impact on the national image of China in the modern era, as many (often derogatory and racist) stereotypes against the Chinese people by the Western world, particularly in the United States during the 19th century and early 20th century, were based on the depiction of Qing dynasty attires. Derogatory terms also emerged in Japan targetting the practice, such as "queue slaves" (辮髮奴/べんぱつど, benpatsudo) or "Qing slaves" (ちゃんころ, chankoro). Joseon Korea, then a tributary state of Qing, also began to assume the status of "Little China" and pejoratively addressed the Qing as "barbarians" (Korean: 이로; Hanja: 夷虜; RR: iru). Contemporary Chinese clothings such as qipao and tangzhuang are also modified designs directly derived from qizhuang and magua, respectively.

== History ==
In 1644, on the first day when Wu Sangui defected to the Qing, the Manchu army under Dorgon entered the Shanhai Pass and routed Li Zicheng's Shun forces in the Battle of Shanhai Pass. The Qing forces then proceeded to attack the Southern Ming rump regime and the remnant Shun and Xi rebels, with the Eight Banners looting and seizing land from the conquered Han Chinese populace.

After the Manchus established the Qing dynasty, the authorities issued decrees requiring Han Chinese men to shave their heads completely, leaving only a patch of about one square inch (roughly 6.5 cm²) of hair at the back of the scalp, and to braid that remaining hair into a queue, in imitation of the Manchu hairstyle. Because the shape resembled a rat's tail, this hairstyle was known at the time as the "money-rat tail" (or "rat-tail queue"). However, this policy was halted just a month later due to intense resistance from the Han Chinese near Beijing, and only after the Manchu captured Nanjing, the capital of the Southern Ming in 1645, was the Tifayifu policy resumed and enforced strictly.

Rumor has it that the full edict was implemented after two officials from Shandong, Sun Zhixie and Li Ruolin, shaved their foreheads as a token of loyalty and demanded that Dorgon impose the queue hairstyle on the entire population. The memorials submitted by Sun Zhixie and others were first recorded in the Qing Bai Lei Chao , compiled by Xu Ke in the early years of the Republic of China, more than two and a half centuries after the events in question. Sun Qixin has pointed out that these memorials were merely a pretext used by the Manchu rulers of the Qing dynasty to issue the Tifayifu, and that Sun Zhixie himself was nothing more than a scapegoat for the policy of shaving heads and changing clothing. Sun Zhixie was eventually dismembered by anti-Qing forces. These two individuals are generally denounced by the Han people as traitors and stooges. Within one year after conquering China proper, the Qing rulers demanded that all Han men adopt the Manchu hairstyle or face execution.

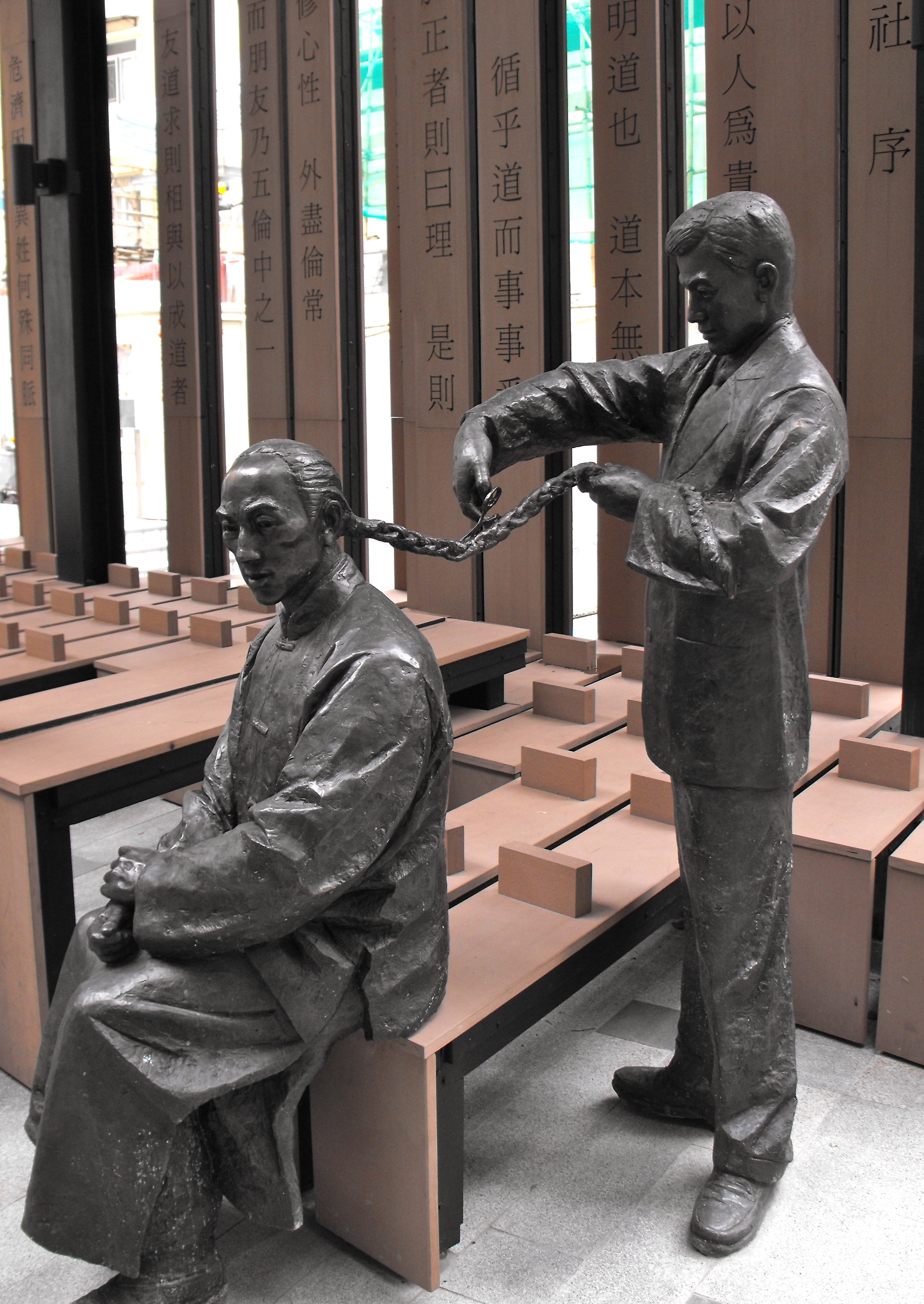
A bronze statue in Pak Tsz Lane Park, Hong Kong commemorating queue-cutting after the overthrow of the Qing dynasty

Tifayifu was strongly opposed by the Han Chinese, especially those who were part of the late-Ming scholar-official class, who saw the policy as part of a culturicide or "civilizational death" (亡天下) as coined by Gu Yanwu. Even ten years after the implementation of the edict, there was still resistance to haircutting and adoption of Manchu-style clothing. During the Kangxi Emperor's reign, a large number of ordinary people still followed the clothing and hairstyle of the Ming dynasty, except for the officials and military generals, who had to wear the Manchu queue and uniforms. Resistance to the policy was a rallying call used by many rebel movements during the early Qing dynasty (such as the Revolt of the Three Feudatories), and the Ming Zheng regime in Taiwan refused to surrender citing Tifayifu specifically as a reason. This forced the Qing government to maintain large numbers of Eight Banners reservists in segregated urban garrisons known as Manchu quarters (滿城) in order to readily mobilize and suppress insurgencies. However, with time, the Qing dynasty consolidated their rule, and eventually during the High Qing era Han Chinese men and women both adopted Manchu-style clothing such as changshan and magua under the threat of massacre.

By the mid-Qing, officials, scholars and many commoners all wore Manchu-style clothing, although anti-Qing movements such as the Heaven and Earth Society and Small Swords Society still secretly aspired to revert back to the attires and dressing code of the Ming dynasty. During the Taiping Rebellion, rebel soldiers from the Taiping Heavenly Kingdom were called "long hairs" due to their practice of not shaving and braiding their hair. During the late Qing period, as the ruling capacity declined, some commoners and officials began to wear Hanfu again as an expression of resistance against the Qing dynasty. Many revolutionaries during the late Qing period, such as the Revive China Society, China Revival Society, Furen Literary Society and Alliance Society, many of whom were Han nationalists from the overseas Chinese, student and New Army communities, also encouraged queue-cutting and used "Expel the Tatar barbarians, restore China" (驅除韃虜，恢復中華) as a political slogan leading up to the Xinhai Revolution. After the fall of the Qing dynasty, some descendants of the former rulers, in order to evade responsibility, fabricated evidence claiming that the changes in customs were voluntary on the part of the Han people, in an attempt to cover up the history of forced assimilation and massacres.

== Cultural significance ==
=== Hairstyle ===
Wearing the queue (bianzi) was traditionally a Manchurian hairstyle, which was itself a variant of northern tribes' hairstyle, including the Jurchen. It differed from the way Han Chinese styled their hair; the Han Chinese kept long hair with all their hair grown over their head and was coiled into a topknot, held into place by Chinese headwear. Wearing the queue was unpopular among the Chinese and was met with resistance as shaving the head was against the "system of rites and music" of ancient China and violated the Confucian beliefs of not harming the body which was bestowed by one's parents, as indicated in the Xiaojing: "Our bodies - to every hair and bit of skin - are received by us from our parents, and we must not presume to injure or wound them. This is the beginning of filial piety". Moreover, the traditional hairstyle of the Han Chinese were a fundamental aspect of their cultural identity and shaving their head was one of the greatest insults and was also a form punishment (Chinese: 髡; pinyin: Kūn). The Qing rulers, however, perceived the queue as a visible symbol of submission, refusing to withdraw or modify the regulation. The Manchu, Mongol bannermen and Han bannermen in Later Jin (1616–1636) territories since 1616 were already shaving their foreheads.

The Qing imposed the shaved head hairstyle on men of all ethnicities under its rule even before 1644 like upon the Nanai people in the 1630s who had to shave their foreheads. The men of certain ethnicities who came under Qing rule later like Salar people and Uyghur people already shaved all their heads bald so the shaving order was redundant.

However, the shaving policy was not enforced in the Tusi autonomous chiefdoms in Southwestern China where many minorities lived. There was one Han Chinese Tusi, the Chiefdom of Kokang populated by Han Kokang people.

=== Clothing ===
Han Chinese and Manchu robes
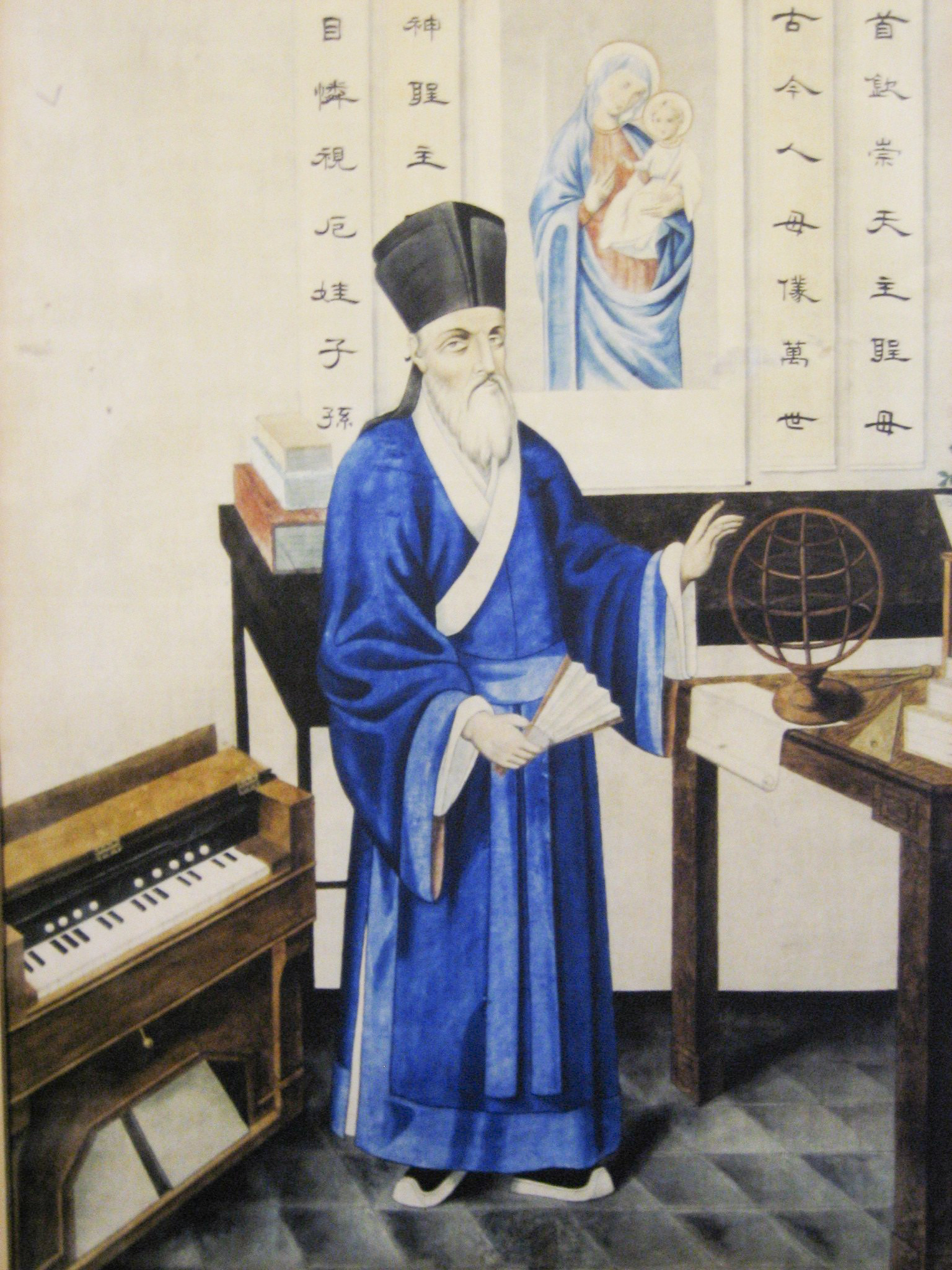
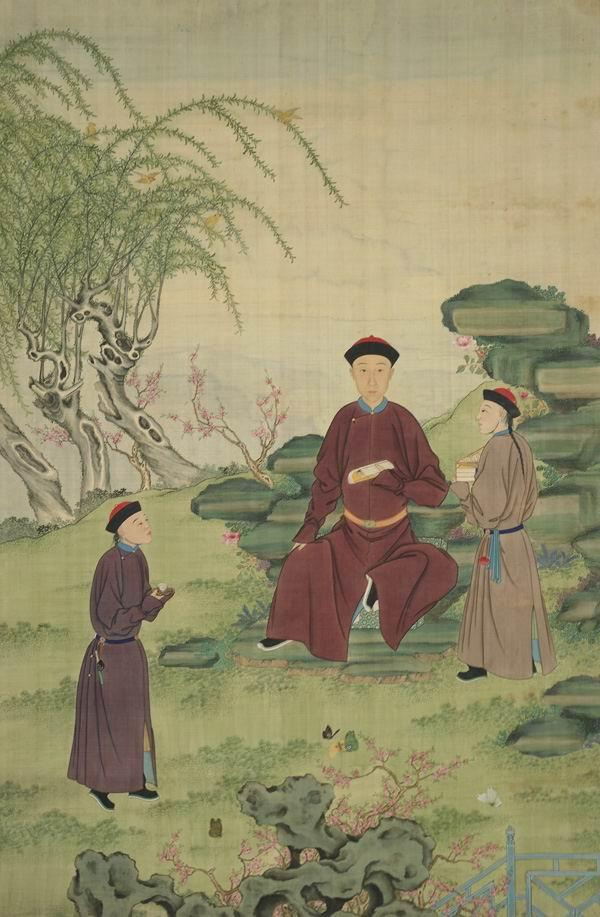
Differences between the Han shenyi (left, late Ming dynasty), and Manchu neitao (right, early Qing dynasty)

Throughout China's multicultural history, clothing has been shaped through an intermingling of Han clothing styles, the Han Chinese being the dominant ethnicity, and the styles of various ethnic groups. Some examples include the standing collar of the cheongsam, which has been found in relics from the Ming dynasty, ruled by the Han Chinese, and was subsequently adopted in the Qing dynasty as Manchu clothing items. Manchu robes were initially collarless. The Manchu also adopted the right closure from the Han Chinese as they initially closed their robes on the left side.

Han Chinese and Manchu women's attire

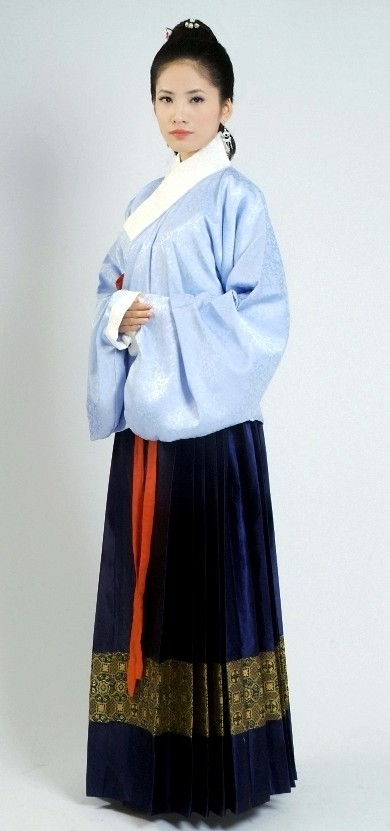
Han Chinese aoqun

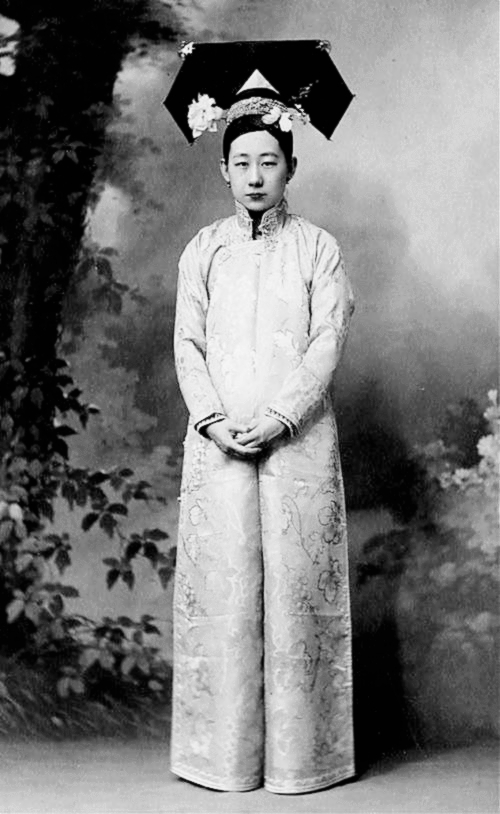
Manchu chenyi

Left: A Ming-style aoqun, a popular type of two-piece female outerwear. Below the upper garment (a short cross-collared jacket called ru), the skirt (qun) is a mamianqun, which was inherited into and further developed by the Qing dynasty.
Right: Lady Aisin-Gioro Hengxiang, the birth mother of Wanrong, wearing the traditional one-piece Manchu robe, a chenyi, that later inspired the cheongsam.

==== Differences between Manchu and Han Chinese clothing ====
Manchu and Han Chinese clothing (Hanfu, including those worn in the Ming dynasty) differed from each other, the broad and general description of such differences in how Ming dynasty clothing is typically associated with sedentary characteristics such as being loose, "ample, flowing robes" with wide and long-sleeves which restricted movement and with "slippers with upturned toes" while the Manchu clothing were "boots, trousers and functional riding coats of coat of nomadic horsemen" allowing physical mobility. Manchu coats were close fitting and had slashed openings on the four sides which allowed greater ease of movements when horse-riding; the sleeves were long and tight ending in horse-hoof shape which were designed to protects the hands from the wind; trousers were worn by both Manchu men and women, and their boots had rigid soles which facilitated mounted archery. For the Han Chinese, however, Manchu-style clothing conflicted with their Confucian prescriptions which govern their attire.

The "y-shaped collar (cross-collar with right lapel over left), wide sleeves, absence of buttons, side-tying sashes, a relatively slim waistband that does not dominate the visual focus, and the sash knot tied at the front" represents the most uncontroversial form of Hanfu and the one that best embodies Hanfu aesthetics. Hanfu also has a small number of forms with metal buttons, stand-up collars, symmetrical front openings, or diagonal front openings, but these have never become mainstream; Hanfu aesthetics favor buttonless or concealed-button designs. A common point of confusion is that frog buttons (Pankou) , although originating from Hanfu, is a very minor element within Hanfu and have long fallen out of use. If a garment features frog buttons or centipede buttons (continuous fabric toggles), it no longer qualifies as Hanfu. In particular, the cheongsam (qipao) and Tang suit are not Hanfu but belong to Manchu clothing. The core difference between Hanfu and Manchu attire is that Hanfu does not use frog buttons, rows of non-metal buttons, or the "changzijin"-shaped collar (a collar opening in the shape of the Chinese character "厂").

==== Manchu's refusal to adopt Chinese clothing ====
Manchu clothing were associated with martial vigour. When Hong Taiji drew up the dressing code after 1636, he made a direct association between the decline of the Liao, Jin and Yuan dynasties (all non-Han Chinese regimes) with the adoption of Hanfu and the adoption of a sedentary lifestyle. Hong Taiji therefore reminded the Banner princes and Manchu officials (in 1635 and in 1637) that the conquests by the Manchu were through riding and archery, and thus the wide and broad-sleeved clothing of the Ming dynasty were entirely unsuitable to the Manchu lifestyle and worried that his descendant would adopt Han Chinese customs while forgetting the sources of their greatness; therefore, the Manchu strongly rejected the adoption of Ming dynasty court clothing. It is recorded that Hong Taiji said in 1636:

Previously, the wise men . . . would often advise me [Hong Taiji] to abandon our Manchu clothing and hats for Chinese clothing and hats, and to adopt the Chinese way. I refused. They would not accept my reasons. Now, here, I want to give myself as an example. If those of us gathered here wore wide-sleeved clothing, how would we be able to stand with a quiver of arrows on the right side and a bow on the left? How could we take in hand the advance of a brave peregrine falcon [i.e., practice falconry]? If we give up archery and horsemanship, then we can certainly wear wide-sleeved clothing. But then how are we any different from those depraved people who eat meat cut by others

— Macabe Keliher, The Board of Rites and the Making of Qing China, p. 157

Hong Taiji was again cited by the Qianlong Emperor when urging his descendants to maintain the wearing of Manchu dress.

==== Symbol of submission ====
Along with the adoption of the queue, the abandonment of traditional Hanfu through the adoption of Manchu clothing was also perceived as a symbol of submission by the Manchu. However, the early Qing court did not allow Han Chinese men to wear all forms of Manchu items as they prohibited Chinese men from wearing certain specific Manchu items, such as clothing made of fur.

==== Women's fashion ban ====
The early Qing court also forbid Manchu women from dressing themselves in Han Chinese women's fashion, which included the wearing of Ming-style clothing with wide sleeves and from foot-binding (in 1638 by Hong Taiji for the Manchu women, in 1645 by Emperor Shunzhi and in 1662 and 1664 for both Han Chinese and Manchu; the ban on foot-binding for Han Chinese was eventually abandoned). Manchu women were also forbidden wearing a single earring (a Han Chinese custom) and had to wear three earrings in one ear instead (Manchu custom).

However, from the middle of the 18th century, the women dress code were being infringed as it is recorded that the Qianlong Emperor stated that "there were girls who emulated Han Chinese clothing and jewelry. This is truly not the Manchu custom" when he inspected the marriage draft. The dress code continued to be infringed as recorded in 1775 (when bondservant daughters were observed wearing one earring instead of 3 in one ear), in 1804 (when 19 girls came up with bound feet), in 1839 (when an imperial edict was decreed punishing fathers of young girls who presented themselves for imperial inspection wearing Chinese-style upper garment with wide sleeves).

Therefore, although Manchu clothing was prevalent and Hanfu was forbidden in daily life, Hanfu-style clothing did not cease existing in society.

== Tifayifu exemptions ==
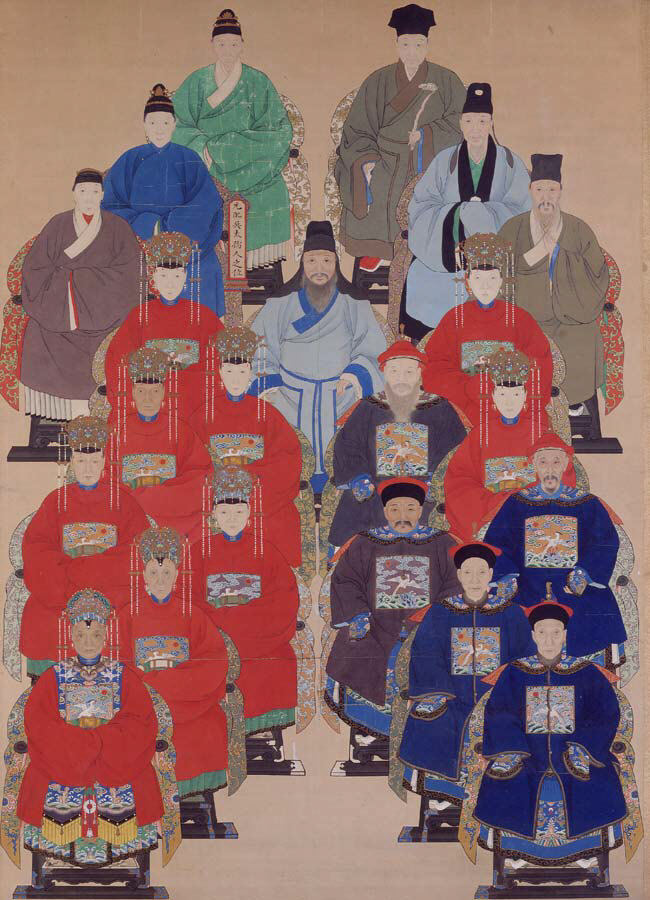
Painting depicting the transition from the Ming to the Qing dynasty attire system: in the Qing dynasty, men had to wear Qizhuang while women were allowed to wear Hanfu, Twenty-one Ancestors with Spirit Tablet, Qing dynasty.

In order to stabilize its rule and integrate the cultural system of the Han Chinese, the Qing dynasty court adopted a mitigation policy, which consisted of 10 exemptions to the tifayifu policy known as the shicong shibucong (十从十不从; 十從十不從; 'Ten rules that must be obeyed and ten that need not be obeyed'). This policy was proposed by Jin Zhijun (金之俊), a Han Chinese official of the Ming dynasty who surrendered to Qing dynasty, wherein the specifics of those exemptions were made with ten pairs of lines:

1. Men had to shave and braid their hair, and wear Manchu clothes, while women still wore the original hairstyle and Han-style clothes;
2. During his life, he had to wear Manchu clothes, and after his death, he could wear Han-style clothes;
3. Affairs of the overworld must be handled by means of Manchus, but the affairs of the underworld are still handled traditionally;
4. The official must wear the Qing official uniform, but the slaves still wore the Ming clothing;
5. When a child is young, he need not obey, but when grown up, he must follow the rules of Manchu;
6. Ordinary people had to wear Manchu clothes and hairstyles, but monks and priests should wear Han-style clothes;
7. Prostitutes wore the clothes required by the Qing court, while actors were free to wear ancient clothes to play the role of the ancients;
8. The official ceremonies must follow the system of the Qing dynasty, while the marriage ceremonies should keep the tradition of the Han people;
9. The state title was changed from Ming dynasty to Qing dynasty, but the official title names remain;
10. Taxes and official services should follow the Manchu system, while the language remain in Chinese.

— Su Wenhao, Study on the Inheritance and Cultural Creation of Manchu Qipao Culture

Therefore, the tifayifu policy mainly applied to adult men, and the people who were generally exempted from the tifayifu policy were Han Chinese women, Han Chinese children, Buddhist and Taoist monks, deceased Han Chinese men and performers in Chinese theatres. While the qizhuang was used in dominant spaces (e.g. ritual and official locations), Hanfu continued to be used in subordinate spaces (in theatre and women's quarters).

== Consequences of tifayifu edict ==
=== Executions and progressive adoption of Manchu-style clothing by men ===
Voicing disapproval to the queue order and urging to the return of Chinese fashion (Ming-style) led to the execution of Chen Mingxia (a former Ming dynasty official) for treason in 1654 by the Shunzi emperor; Chen Mingxia suggested that the Qing dynasty court should adopt Ming-style clothing "in order to bring peace to the empire". It also led to the execution of Liu Zhenyu during the Qianlong era for urging the clothing to be changed to what is presumed to Ming-style fashion.

Frederic Wakeman Jr. points out that the hair-shaving order was the direct trigger for armed resistance, while the change of clothing was implemented as an attached requirement bundled along with it at the time. Wakeman considers Dorgon's insistence on forcibly imposing the queue and Manchu attire to be the single greatest strategic blunder of the early Qing conquest. Therefore, there was no such situation in which "the scholar-official class adopted Manchu dress while the vast majority of men could still wear Ming-style clothing." Moreover, women were not entirely exempted either; they were only permitted to wear Manchu banner-style attire (qizhuang), but they were allowed to wear a two-piece form consisting of a separate top and skirt, which differed from the one-piece dress (qipao) of Manchu women. This represented the only surviving formal element of Han Chinese clothing, but it should not be taken as evidence that they were allowed to wear actual Hanfu. Additionally, the practice of foot-binding among women was also rapidly promoted during the Qing dynasty.

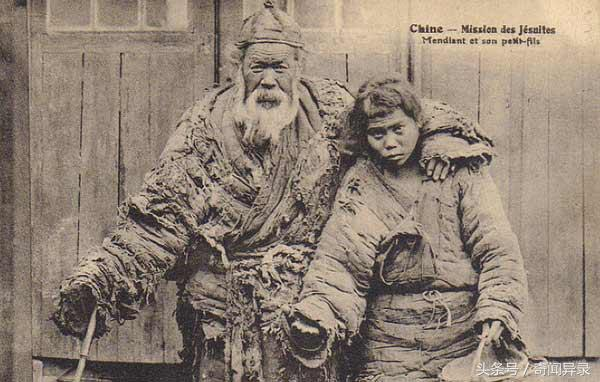
A pair of beggars, grandfather and grandson, from the late Qing Dynasty, were wearing Hanfu. Although the clothes were tattered, the characteristics of Hanfu were obvious.

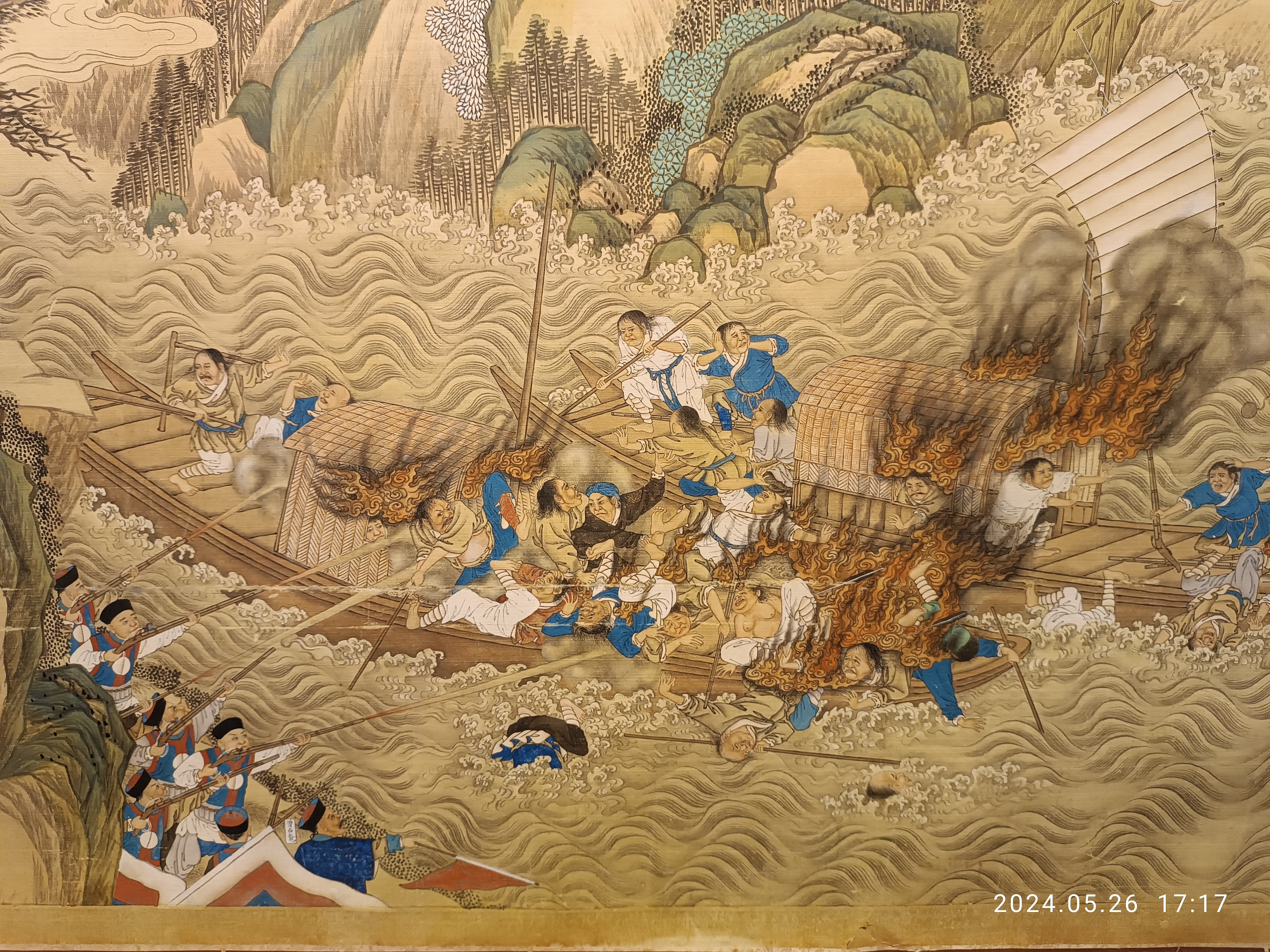
People from the Taiping Rebellion wore Hanfu and kept their hair long.

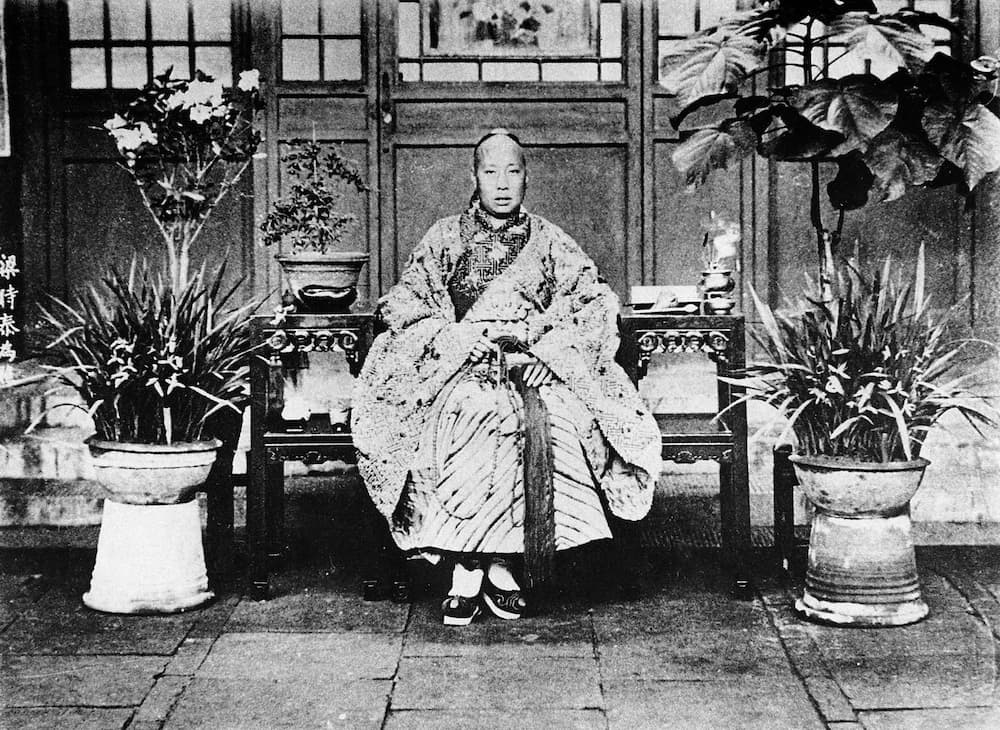
A senior Eunuch in the late Qing Dynasty, he was wearing Hanfu

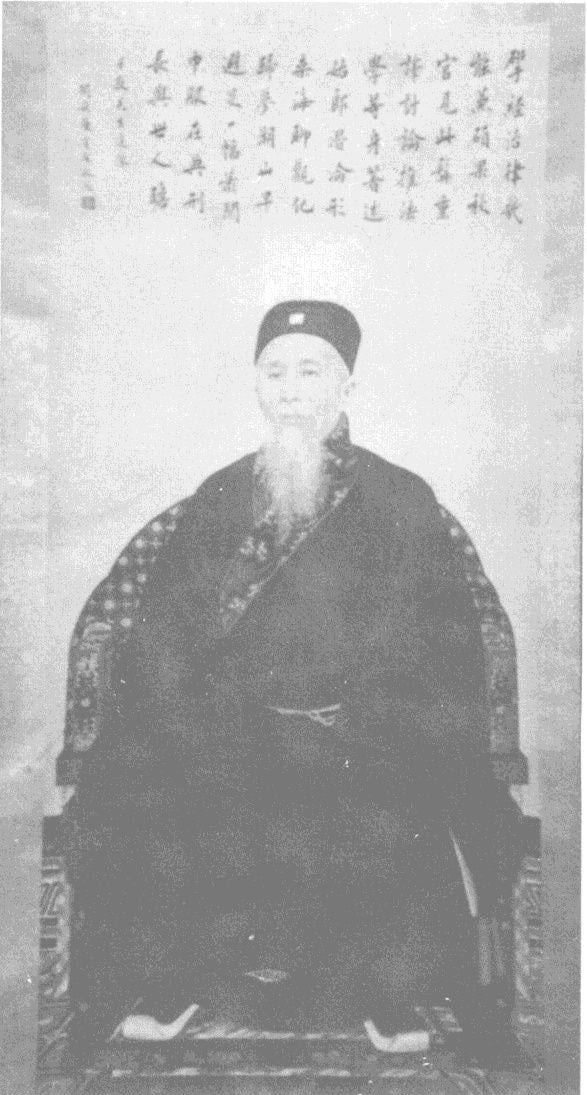
Shen Jiaben, the Minister of Justice, who is known as one of the Ten Ministers of the Late Qing Dynasty, wears Hanfu in his daily life.

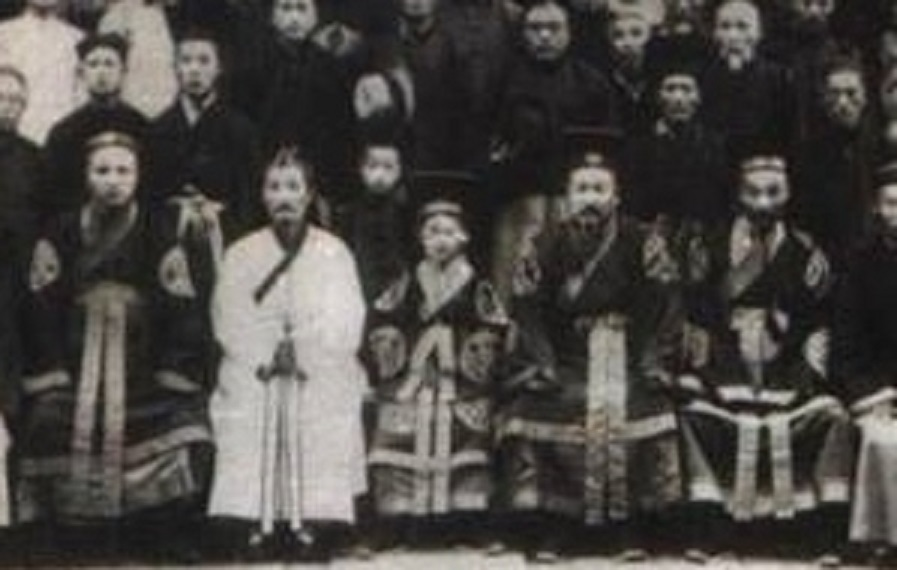
Part of the participants of the 17th Confucius Conference wear Hanfu, 1910s.

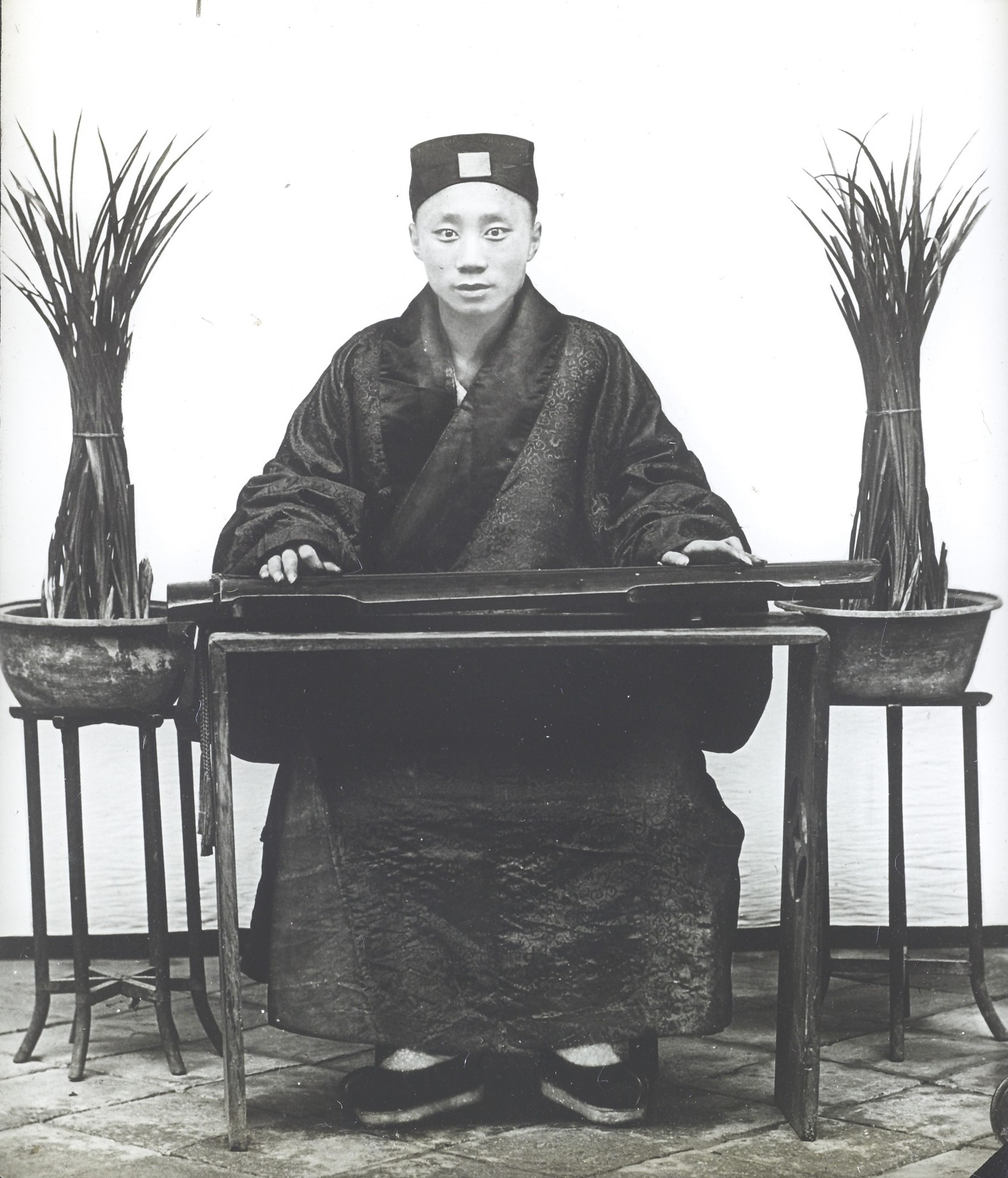
Upper Class Man Sitting at a Table Playing the Qin, 1906-1912.

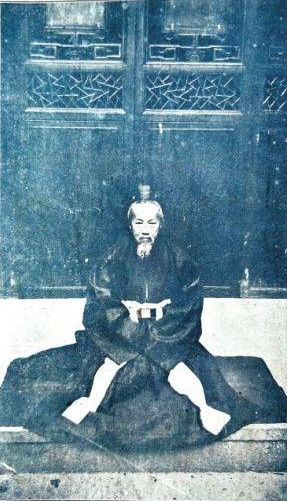
A man wearing Hanfu in the late Qing Dynasty

=== Resistance and massacres ===
The Tifayifu policy lead to outrage and resistance, especially in central and south China, when the unpopular policy united educated men and peasants together in resistance. In 1645, during military campaigns in south China, Manchu troops were ordered to kill any Chinese who refused to shave his head. The Tifayifu policy led to great bloodshed and resentment among the Chinese.

Out of resentment for the policy and loyalty for the Ming dynasty, some areas in China fought back against the Manchu which provoked the Qing dynasty to massacre entire populations. There were accounts of such massacres perpetuated by Qing soldiers in southern cities such as Jiading, Yangzhou, and Jiangyin, where tens of thousands of people were deliberately and brutally killed.

The Yangzhou Massacre occurred in May 1645, when the Manchu general Dodo ordered the slaughter of the populace of Yangzhou after capturing thr city. It is said that 800,000 people perished.

Li Chengdong, a general who had served the Ming but defected to the Qing, ordered troops to carry out three separate massacres in the city of Jiading within a month, resulting in tens of thousands of deaths. The three massacres at Jiading District are some of the most infamous.

In June 1645, news that men were required to adopt Manchu hairstyle reached the city of Jiangyin. The city of Jiangyin held out against about 10,000 Qing troops for 83 days; when the city wall was finally breached on October 9, 1645, the Qing army, led by General Liu Liangzuo (劉良佐), who had been ordered to "fill the city with corpses before you sheathe your swords," massacred the entire population, killing between 74,000 and 100,000 people. Although General Liu proclaimed that only adult men were to be executed, Liu's soldiers indiscriminately incinerated women and children in their houses. Of the initial population estimated to be about 100,000, there were only 53 reported survivors following the Jiangyin massacre.

Soldiers in 1645 under Hong Chengchou forced the queue on the people of Jiangnan while Han people were initially paid silver to wear the queue in Fuzhou when it was first implemented.

== See also ==
- Queue Order
- Hua-Yi distinction
- Hanfu movement
