= Mandarin collar =

Clothing of neck article

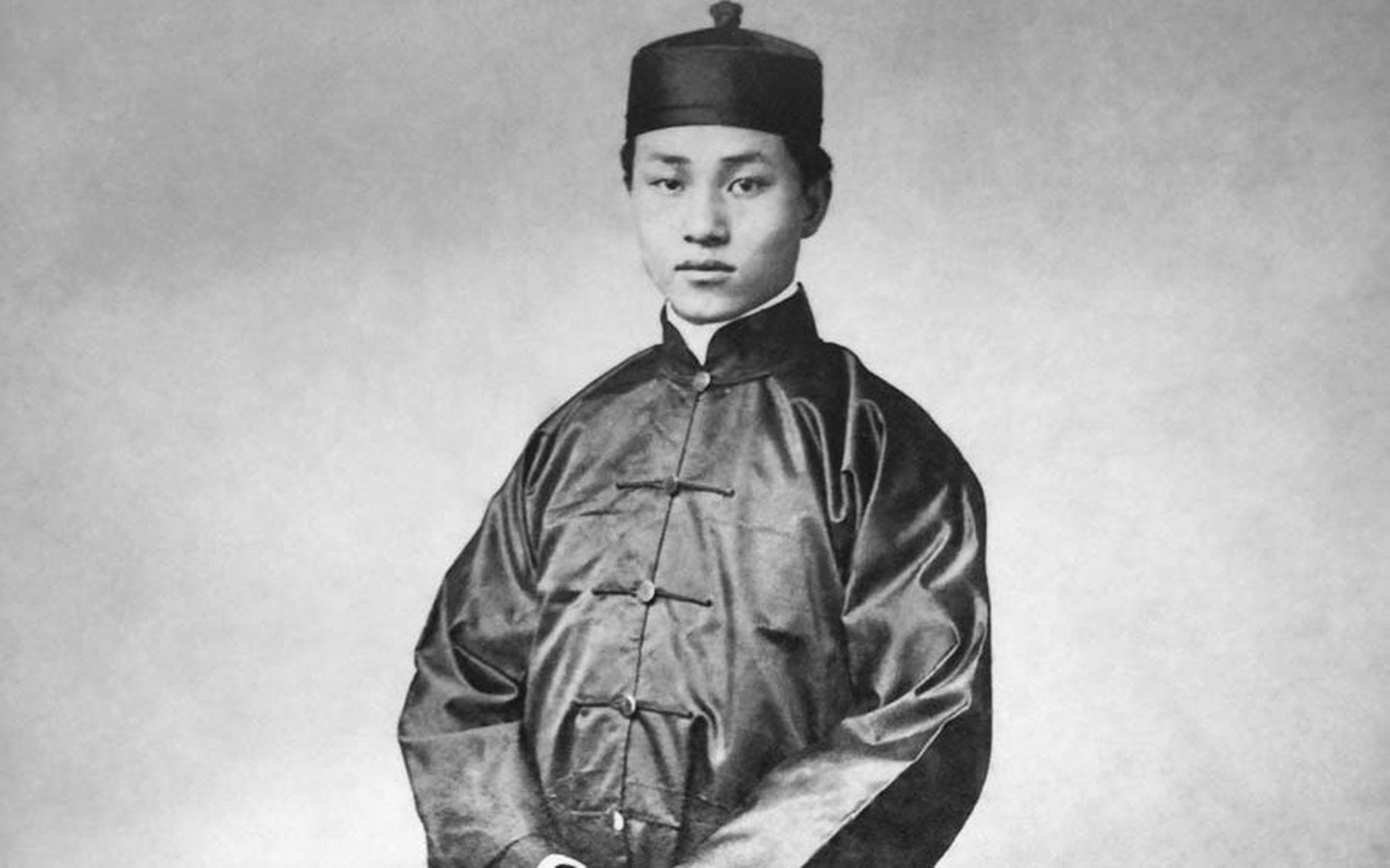
A Chinese man, Ye Jinglu, is photographed wearing a traditional Mandarin collar shirt in the early 1900s.

A mandarin collar, standing collar, Nehru collar, band collar or choker collar is a short unfolded stand-up collar style on a shirt or jacket. The style derives its Western name from the mandarin bureaucrats in Qing-era China that employed it as part of their uniform.

The length along a mandarin collar is straight, with either straight or rounded edges at top of the centre front. The edges of the collar either barely meet at the centre front or overlap slightly. Overlapping mandarin collars are often a continuation of a shirt's placket and have a button on the collar to secure the two sides of the shirt together.

== History ==
=== China ===
In China, the use of the high collar on minority ethnic jackets is typically a Han Chinese influence. The use of high collar in clothing started in the late Ming dynasty and it continued to be worn in the Qing dynasty.

In the Ming dynasty, the standup collar were closed with interlocking buttons made of gold and silver, called zimukou (Chinese: 子母扣). The appearance of interlocking buckle promoted the emergence and the popularity of the standup collar and the Chinese jacket with buttons at the front, and laid the foundation of the use of Chinese knot buckles. In women garments of the Ming dynasty, the standup collar with gold and silver interlocking buckles became one of the most distinctive and popular form of clothing structure; it became commonly used in women's clothing reflecting the conservative concept of Ming women's chastity by keeping their bodies covered and due to climate changes during the Ming dynasty (i.e. the average temperature was low in China).

In the Qing dynasty, the use of high collar in clothing was however not a common feature in clothing before the 20th century. During the late Qing dynasty, the stand-up collar was integrated into the clothing of both the Han and the Manchu. The standing collar became a defining characteristics of the long jacket worn with a long skirt (aoqun) or worn with trousers (shanku) for the Han women and it continued to remain so in the Republic of China. The standing collar somehow became one of the defining characteristics of Chinese dress.

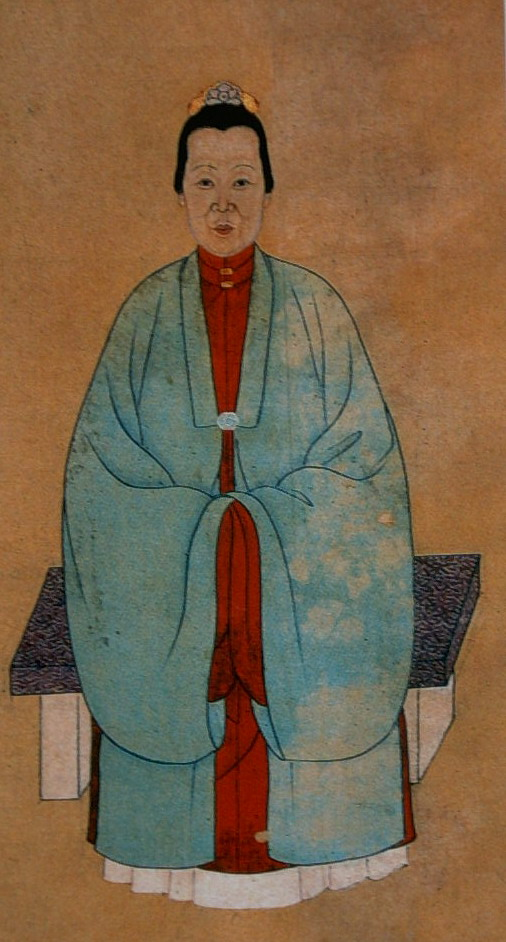
Painting of a noble woman wearing a red chang ao (a type of long jacket) with standing collar, Ming dynasty.

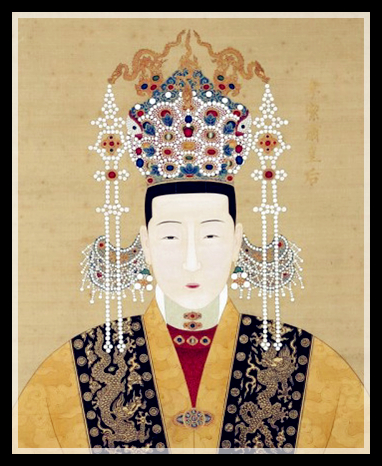
Painting of Empress Xiaojiesu wearing a standing collar garment (in white), Ming dynasty.

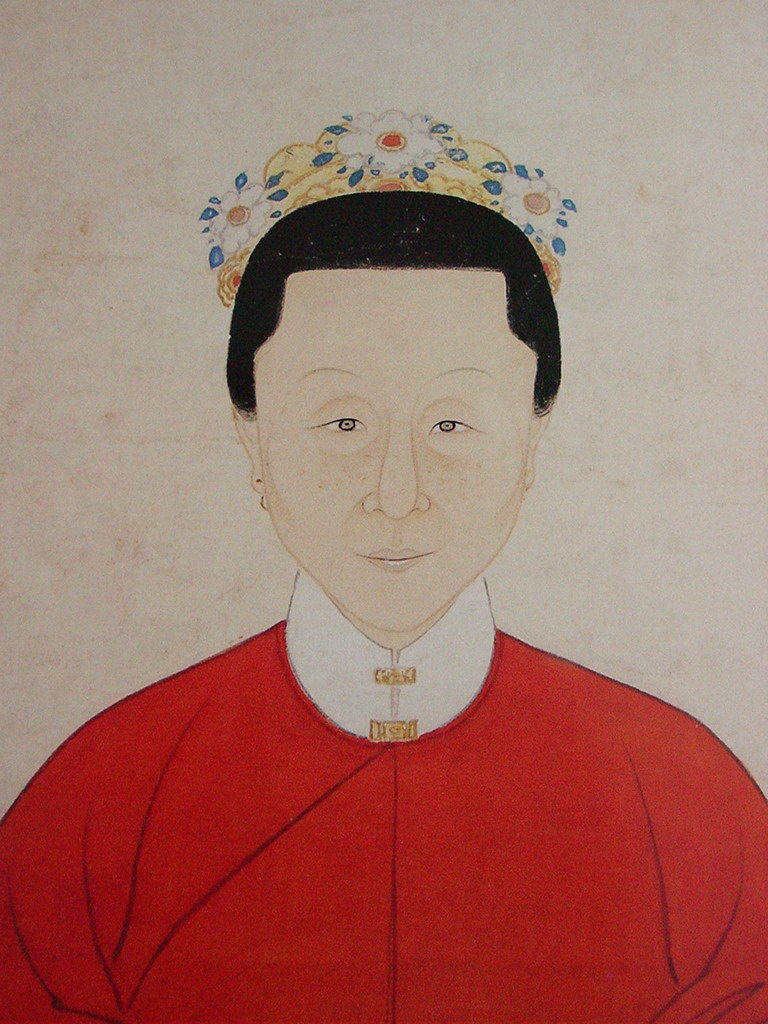
A woman, Ming dynasty

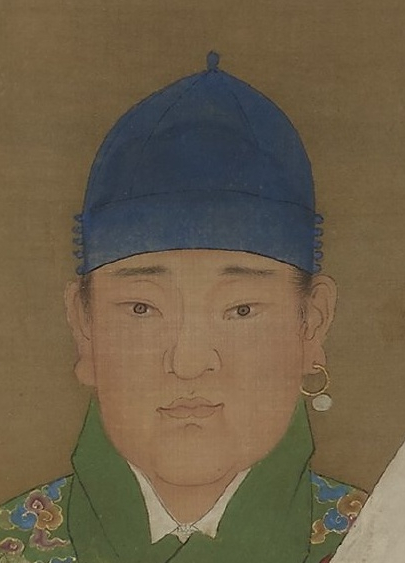
Painting of attendant wearing a standing collar folded over jiaoling.

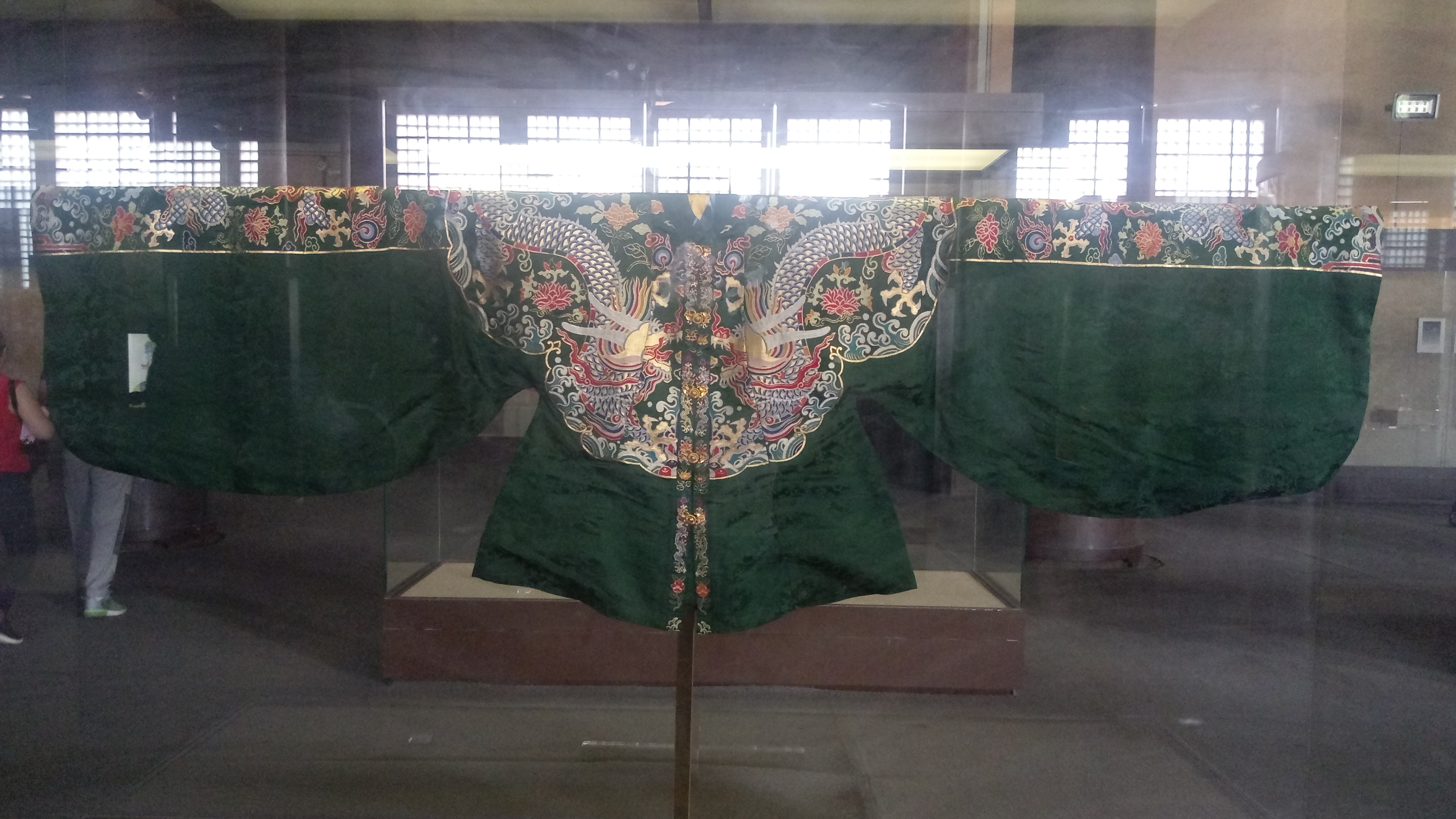
Green brocade ru-jacket, Ming dynasty.

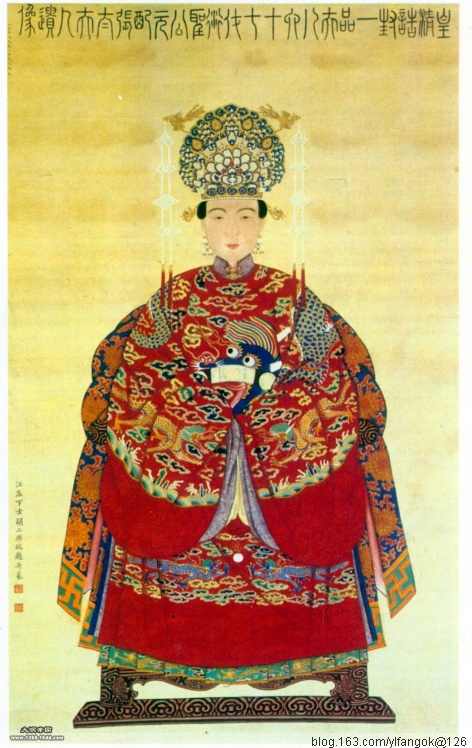
Chinese woman, Qing dynasty painting

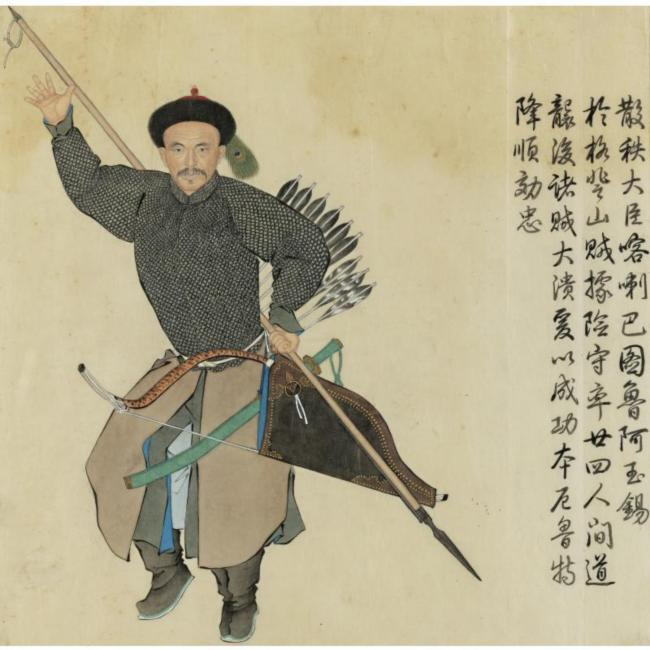
Ayusi, an officer of the Qing Army, late 1700s.

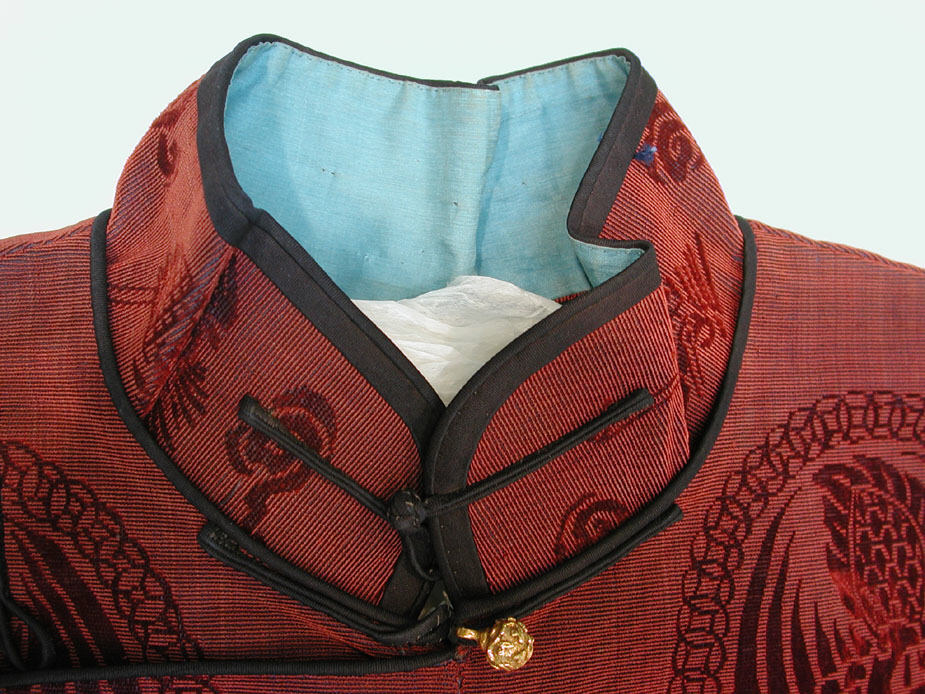
Mandarin collar which closes with pankou, 19th century.

== Related nomenclature ==
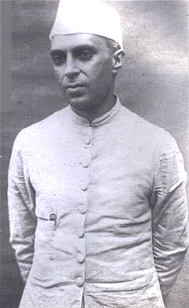
Jawaharlal Nehru in a achkan or sherwani, a garment which served as a model for the Nehru jacket with mandarin collar

A similar style known as the Raj pattern or Nehru collar is also found in some modern Indian men's clothing, such as the Nehru jacket. (Named for Jawaharlal Nehru, Prime Minister of India 1947–1964, who commonly wore clothing with this type of collar.)

A band is often a mandarin collar. This term is also used for shirts that have only a flat finishing around the neckline; originally such garments were designed for use with a detachable collar, a largely forgotten usage.

== Usage ==
In contemporary Western dress, mandarin collars are found in Asian-style and minimalist clothing. Women's mandarin-collared jackets often include other vaguely Asian elements, such as pankou (silk knots) as closures instead of buttons.

Since mandarin collars are short and do not fold over, neckties are not worn with mandarin-collared dress shirts, apart from bow ties. This lack of ties may have led to the recent rising popularity of mandarin collars.

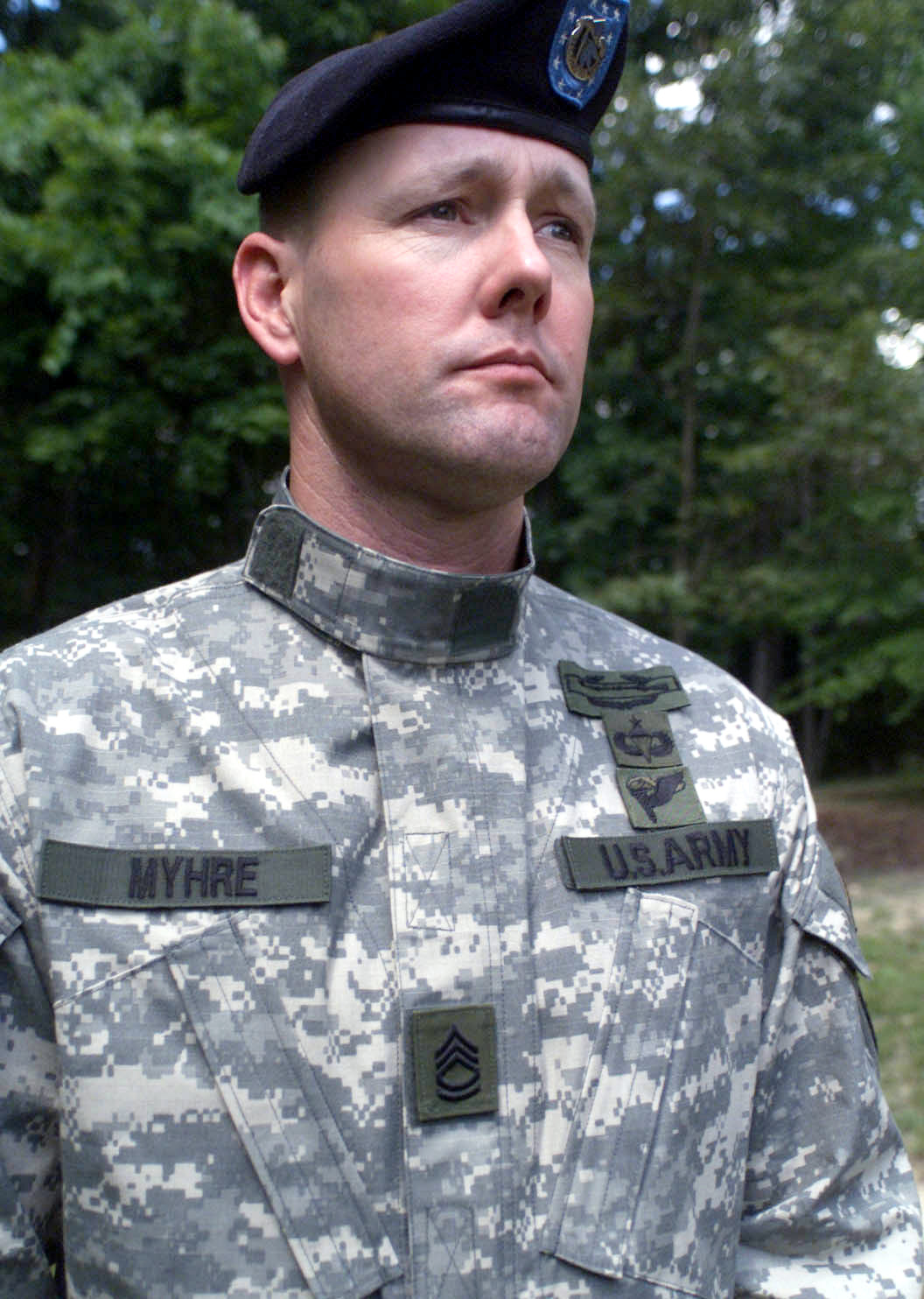
A US soldier wearing an Army Combat Uniform with a mandarin collar.

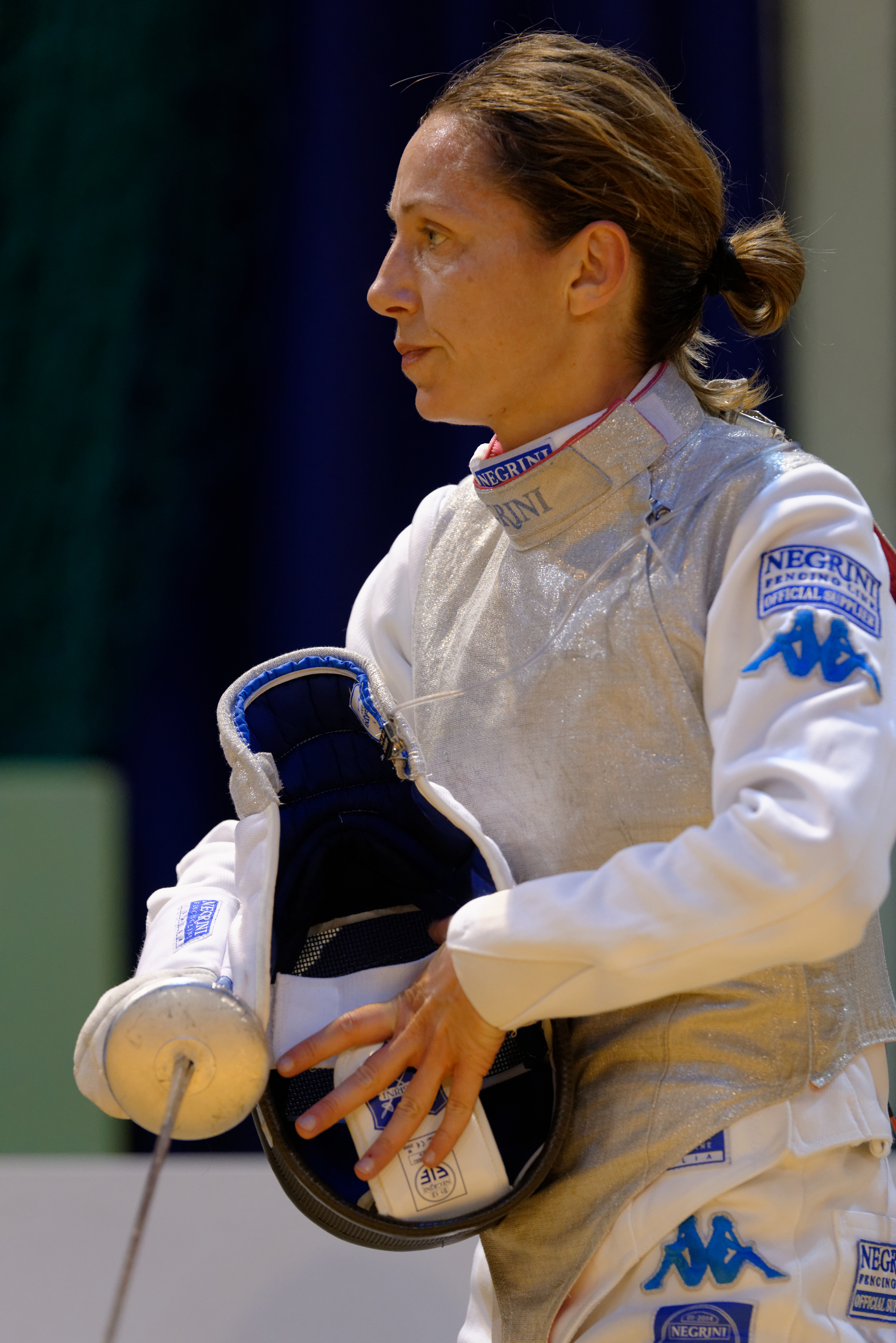
The collar as seen in sport fencing dress.

Standing collars are common on military full dress uniforms, such as those of the British Army, US Navy and US Marine Corps. Mandarin collars are also utilized in combat uniforms, such as the US Army's Army Combat Uniform. The presence of the mandarin collar on the ACU makes the wearing of body armor more comfortable by lifting the collar up to prevent chafing. The Russian Army uses a mandarin collar in their newer VKBO uniforms.

Mandarin collars are also the proper shape for a single-breasted Greek cassock, or anterri, for Eastern Orthodox and Eastern Catholic clergy. Russians and other Slavic Churches typically have a high, band-style collar, buttoning to the side or on the shoulder, while Greeks have the "notched" Mandarin pattern with a closing loop or hook at the bottom of the "V" in the collar.

The collar is also used for the required sport fencing dress.

Police wicking shirts worn by police forces in the UK have a mandarin collar.

== In pop culture ==
Mandarin collars feature in costumes in some notable films, where they are employed either as a futuristic style fashion or to create a distinctive appearance for sinister characters. The title character in the 1962 James Bond film Dr. No, as well as Bond's nemesis, Ernst Stavro Blofeld, both parodied by Doctor Evil in the Austin Powers series of films are depicted wearing mandarin collared shirts. The mandarin collar can also be found in the uniforms of both the Galactic Empire in the Star Wars films, and the Federation in Star Trek: The Next Generation. Mandarin collar lab coats and a jacket also feature in the CBBC show The Demon Headmaster when the antagonist known as 'The Demon Headmaster' takes on the roles of 'Computer Director' (Series 1 Episodes 4-6), 'Director of the Biogenetic Research Centre' (BRC) (Series 2) and the 'Controller' (Series 3)

The science fiction series Doctor Who featured mandarin collars. One was on a black lab tunic worn by Davros, the forger of the Daleks. One was on shirts worn by the Master in his first and sixth incarnations. And one was on a kente shirt worn by the Doctor in her fugitive incarnation.

== See also ==
- Changshan
- Magua
- Tangzhuang
