= Chinese dress =

Chinese dress may refer to:

- Hanfu, the historical clothing of the Han Chinese people
- Cheongsam, also known as Qipao, a body-hugging one-piece dress for women
- Changpao, a body-hugging one-piece dress for men

== See also ==
- Chinese clothing
