= Expansion (sculpture) =

Mixed media bronze sculpture

- Artist: Paige Bradley
- Completion date: 2004
- Medium: Bronze and electricity
- Subject: Meditation
- Followed by: Illumination
- Website: Expansion

Expansion is a contemporary art mixed media sculpture (bronze and electricity) by Paige Bradley, first exhibited in 2004. It is a depiction of a nude woman in a meditative state with light emanating from cracks in the body.

== History ==
Bradley began with a wax sculpture of a woman who appears to be meditating in the lotus position. She then dropped the sculpture on the floor allowing it to break into pieces. Bradley cast the pieces of the wax sculpture in bronze, and assembled the pieces so that they floated apart from one another and then she had a lighting specialist construct a system which lights the statue from within. The work was first displayed in New York in 2004.

== Design ==
The artist made a series of the sculpture in different sizes. The sculptures have names such as "half life" and "heroic". One of the Expansion sculptures at the Cutter & Cutter Fine Art gallery is life size (47" x 63" x 27"). The Expansion sculpture was said by the Cutter & Cutter Fine Art gallery to be the first ever bronze sculpture to utilize Illumination from within. The illumination makes the sculpture of a naked woman appear to be bleeding light from within out of the spaces between the cracks in the bronze.

== Reception ==
In 2015 Alice Yoo of My Modern Met called it a "Cracked Light Sculpture" and a "stunningly beautiful sculpture". In 2017 Bored Panda put the sculpture at number 1 on their list of "42 of the Most Amazing Sculptures in the World". The success of her sculpture led Bradley to produce more sculptures (Illumination and Illumination, Half Life) with the same theme of "Expansion".
