= Paige Bradley =

American sculptor

Bradley in the studio

Paige Bradley (born 1974) is an American sculptor known for representative figurative bronzes. She became known for her sculpture technique using mixed media of bronze and illumination. Her work became well known with the public display of her sculpture Expansion.

== Early life ==
Bradley was born in 1974. On her website she said, "I was drawing since I can remember, and began casting my work into bronze when I was seventeen." She studied at Pepperdine University, Florence Academy of Art, and also Pennsylvania Academy of Fine Arts.

== Career ==
In 1995 Bradley was assistant sculptor on a monument for the Atlanta Olympic Games. In 2001 she was voted into the National Sculpture Society, the Catherine Lorillard Wolfe Art Club and the Salmagundi Club as a professional sculptor. By 2006, her work was featured in over a dozen galleries, and she was teaching master's workshops and being sought out for public and private commissions. By age 30, she had a strong following of international collectors.

In 2001 Bradley was voted into the National Sculpture Society as a professional sculptor. In 2006 the Ballet International Foundation commissioned her to create a bronze award to be given annually at major international competitions.

In 2004 Bradley created a series of illuminated bronze sculptures and her work called Expansion was the first. Expansion depicted a nude woman's figure sitting in the lotus position with light emanating from cracks in her body.

== Public art ==
- St. Cloud Hospital Ribbon of Hope and Courage
- Bundang Memorial Park "Momentum"
- Point Park University "Freedom Bound"
- Lady Hill Sapa Resort "The Cycles of Lady Hill", Lao Cai, Vietnam
- Paul Mellon Arts Center "Any Possible Relation", Wallingford, CT
