= Mixed media =

Artistic technique that uses more than one medium

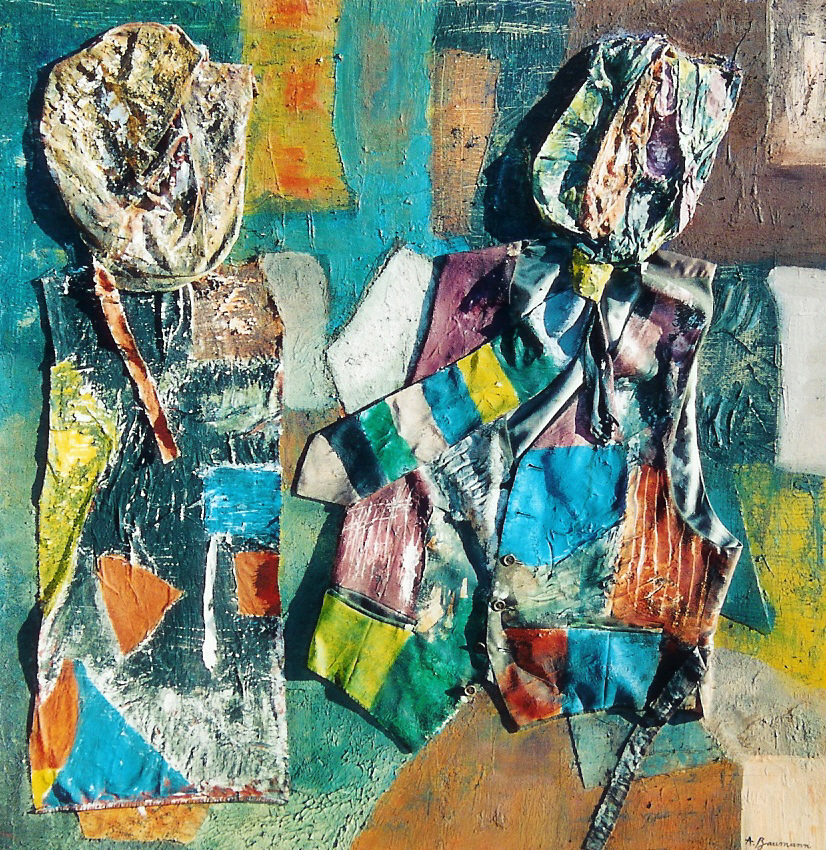
Alberto Baumann, "Inheritance of the Twentieth Century" (1980)

In visual art, mixed media describes artwork in which more than one medium or material has been employed. Assemblages, collages, and sculpture are three common examples of art using different media. Materials used to create mixed media art include, but are not limited to, paint, cloth, paper, wood and found objects.

Mixed media art is distinguished from multimedia art which combines visual art with non-visual elements, such as recorded sound, literature, drama, dance, motion graphics, music, or interactivity.

== History of mixed media ==
The first modern artwork to be considered mixed media is Pablo Picasso's 1912 collage Still Life with Chair Caning, which used paper, cloth, paint and rope to create a pseudo-3D effect. The influence of movements like Cubism and Dada contributed to the mixed media's growth in popularity throughout the 20th century with artists like Henri Matisse, Joseph Cornell, Jean Dubuffet, and Ellsworth Kelly adopting it. This led to further innovations like installations in the late 20th century. Mixed media continues to be a popular form for artists, with different forms like wet media and markings being explored.

== Types of mixed media art ==
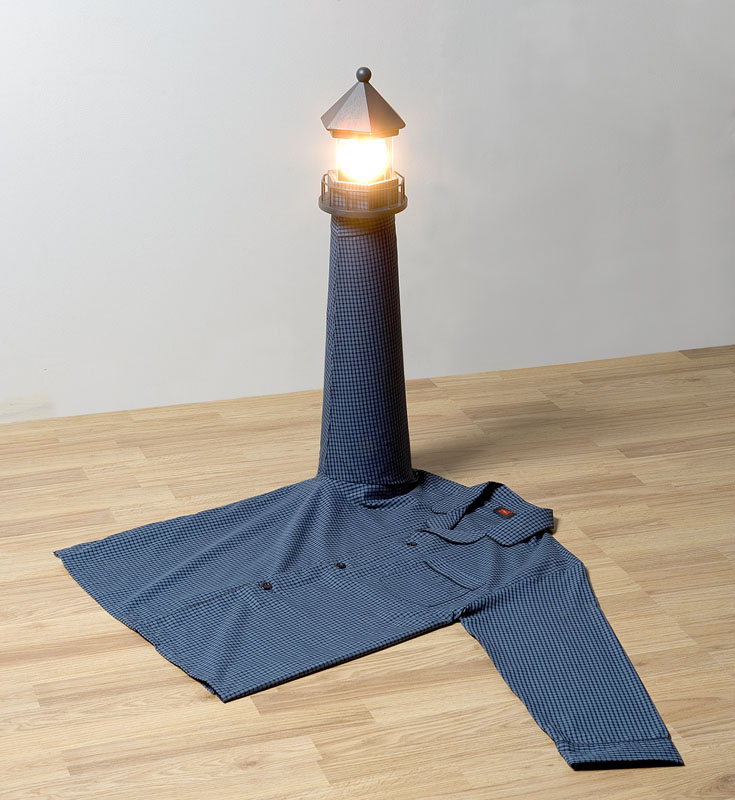
Three-dimensional mixed media art by Adam Niklewicz

Mixed media art can be differentiated into distinct types, some of which are:

Collage
This is an art form which involves combining different materials like ribbons, newspaper clippings, photographs etc. to create a new whole. While it was a sporadic practice in antiquity, it became a fundamental part of modern art in the early 20th century, due to the efforts of Braque and Picasso.
Assemblage
This is a three-dimensional variant of the collage with elements jutting in or out of a defined substrate, or an entirely 3D arrangement of objects and/or sculptures.
Found object art
These are objects that are found and used by artists and incorporated into artworks because of their perceived artistic value. It was popularized by the conceptual artist Marcel Duchamp.
Altered books
Altered books involve physically modifying or repurposing a book as part of an artwork, such as by cutting, pasting, or reshaping its pages. This can involve physically cutting and pasting pages to change the contents of the book or using the materials of the book as contents for an art piece.
Wet and dry media
Wet media consists of materials such as paints and inks that use some sort of liquidity in their usage or composition. Dry materials (such as pencils, charcoal, and crayons) are lacking this inherent liquidity. Using wet and dry media in conjunction is considered mixed media for its combination of inherently differing media to create a finalized piece.

== Examples of mixed media artwork ==
Still Life with Chair Caning: Picasso's piece depicts what can be seen as a table with a cut lemon, a knife, a napkin and a newspaper among other discernible objects. It is elliptical (with speculation that the work itself could be depicting a porthole) and uses a piece of rope to form its edge. Paper and cloth are used for the objects present on the table.

Angel of Anarchy: Eileen Agar's 1937 sculpture is a modified bust of Joseph Bard, which was covered by paper and fur. When this was lost, she made a 1940 variation which shrouded and blinded the figure with feathers, beads and cloth creating an entirely different perspective on the sculpture.

Expansion is a 2004 mixed media sculpture by Paige Bradley which combines bronze and electricity. The Expansion sculpture is thought to be the first bronze sculpture to be illuminated from within.

== See also ==
- Altered book
- Artist trading cards
- Collage
- Décollage
- Intermedia
- List of mixed media artists
- Modular art
- Multimedia
- New media art
- Quilt art
- Visual Focus Depth Art
