= Visual Focus Depth Art =

Visual focus depth art is a form of mixed media collage that places an emphasis on the use of three-dimensional application to individual creations of single one-of-a-kind art pieces to emphasize individual meaning in the work. It is a derivative of assemblage, collage and decollage. The concept is similar to the basic mixed-media collage idea of building up various levels of the piece for emphasis. Known in this medium as projections, the artist tries in a variety of ways to create a visual image that causes the viewer to focus on certain areas of the art framework that would ordinarily be overlooked or relegated to the background rather than to randomly layer structure creating a whole image of the work.

== Origins ==
While the exact origins of visual focus depth art are unknown, the first artwork of its nature began to appear around 2010 in the street art of various cities in Europe, including Paris, Brussels and Amsterdam. This appears to have been a response to the expanding use of computer generation in art to both design and create mixed-media collage works that could be essentially pre-designed and mass-produced. Since that time, various artists have produced series of works-known as ensembles—that are individually unique and limited in scope. Common themes of these ensembles range widely from ideological ideas like bohemianism, libertine and socially relevant matters to historical perspective, such as the interpretation of various time periods and eras.

== Structure of the design ==
The floor/design base of the piece is used to create a theme or story about the subject. Sections of the work are then raised to provide emphasis and act as an accent to substantiate the message. Visual focus depth art is usually created in single pieces or via limited series depending upon the artist involved and is also generally confined to canvass or wooden framework. Larger scale pieces, such as architectural interpretations, are generally not considered part of this medium. Each visual focus depth art piece is unique is not duplicated in any way with the exception of limited prints. While some artists offer limited prints of the original artwork, the number offered is very limited in scope.

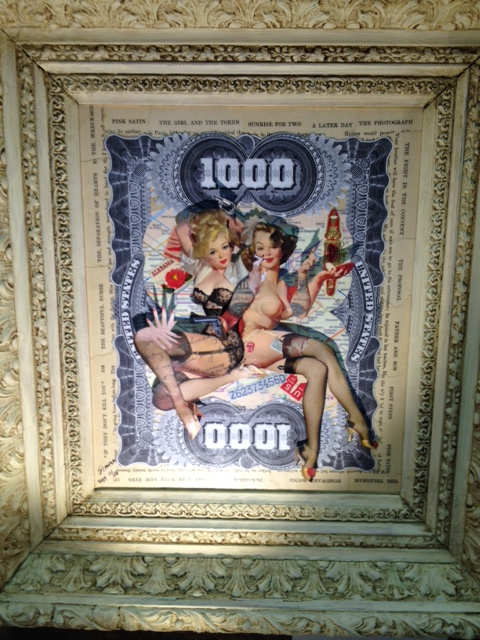
Femme Fatales visual focus depth art

== Background variations ==
The backgrounds used in visual focus depth art range widely from the use of true vintage pieces such as original period sheet music, fractional currency, foreign money or other items that set the time frame for the piece. Each of the items used relate the overall, theme of the art. The background can also be structured in segmented form-through the use of linear script—composed of simply drawn lines with little attempt at pictorial representation, mathematic symbolism—such as the use of angles and formulas and via free-form application—concepts chosen by the artist to represent the underlying theme in the work.

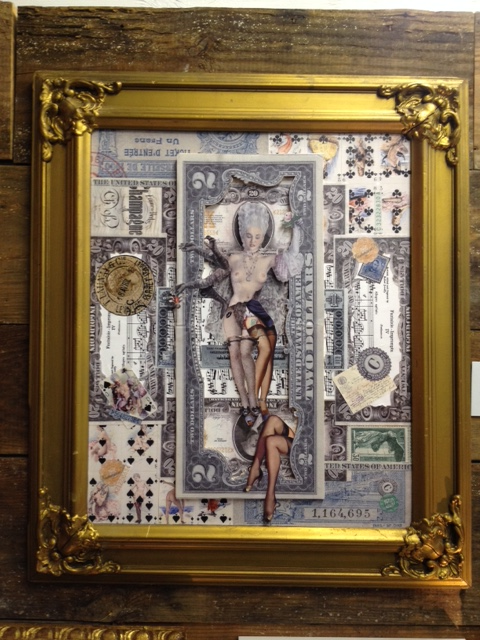
Athena visual focus depth art

Visual focus depth art is based on the unique aspect of every piece being created by the artist. Materials used to emphasize the projections include wooden palates measured to the frame, various forms of corkboard, balsa wood and other materials that are hand-cut or machined by the artist to help raise the projections to the level desired. The use of preformed shapes, three-dimensional printing and advanced computer generation of any kind used to map the work or create the projections is not considered to be part of this art form because the work can be saved, duplicated and even mass-produced. As a result, the art is usually produced by single artists on a variety of scale.
