= Tangzhuang =

Chinese jacket

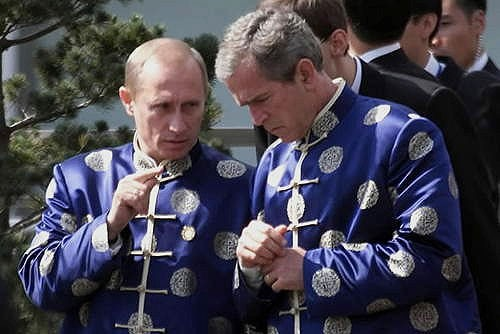
- Vladimir Putin and George W. Bush in tangzhuang at the 2001 APEC summit in Shanghai, China
- Place of origin: China

Chinese name
- Traditional Chinese: 唐裝
- Simplified Chinese: 唐装
- Literal meaning: Tang outfit
Transcriptions
Standard Mandarin
- Hanyu Pinyin: Tángzhuāng
- Wade–Giles: T‘ang^{2}-chuang^{1}
- IPA: [tʰǎŋ.ʈʂwáŋ]

Tangzhuang (Chinese: 唐裝; pinyin: Tángzhuāng; lit. 'Chinese suit'), sometimes called Tang suit, is a kind of Chinese jacket with Manchu origins and Han influences, characterized with a mandarin collar closing at the front with frog buttons. It is an updated form of the Qing magua, itself a more fashionable adaptation of the riding jacket once worn by Manchu horsemen. Nowadays, the tangzhuang is one of the main formal clothing worn by Chinese men on various occasions; overseas Chinese also wear it as a form of fashion or to express their cultural identity.

== Name ==
Tángzhuāng is the pinyin romanization of the Mandarin pronunciation of the clothes' Chinese name, written as 唐裝 in traditional characters and as 唐装 in the simplified characters now used in mainland China. Its spelling may vary a little in other romanizations or dialects. It is also sometimes translated as a tang suit or jacket.

Although the name of the jacket in English and Chinese suggests an origin during (or at least reference to) the Tang period of Chinese history, it was actually intended by its designers to mean a "Chinese" outfit. In fact, "Tangzhuang" is basically the Chinese style of dress in the late Qing Dynasty. The origin of the term "Tangzhuang" also has a taste of "export to domestic sales". Foreigners call "China town" as "Tang People Street", and naturally call Chinese clothing "Tangzhuang". In southern China and among the Chinese diaspora, dialects like Cantonese refer to Han Chinese—as opposed to all Chinese nationals—as "Tang people" rather than "Han". It is thus also sometimes translated as a Chinese jacket. After criticism of the misleading name appeared in various Chinese media, some of its designers and some government officials began to call the garment the "new tangzhuang" or "APEC jackets", but neither name lasted. Instead, most Chinese people came to accept the designers' original name for the garment and some even expanded it to describe any form of traditional Chinese clothing.

== History ==
=== Magua ===
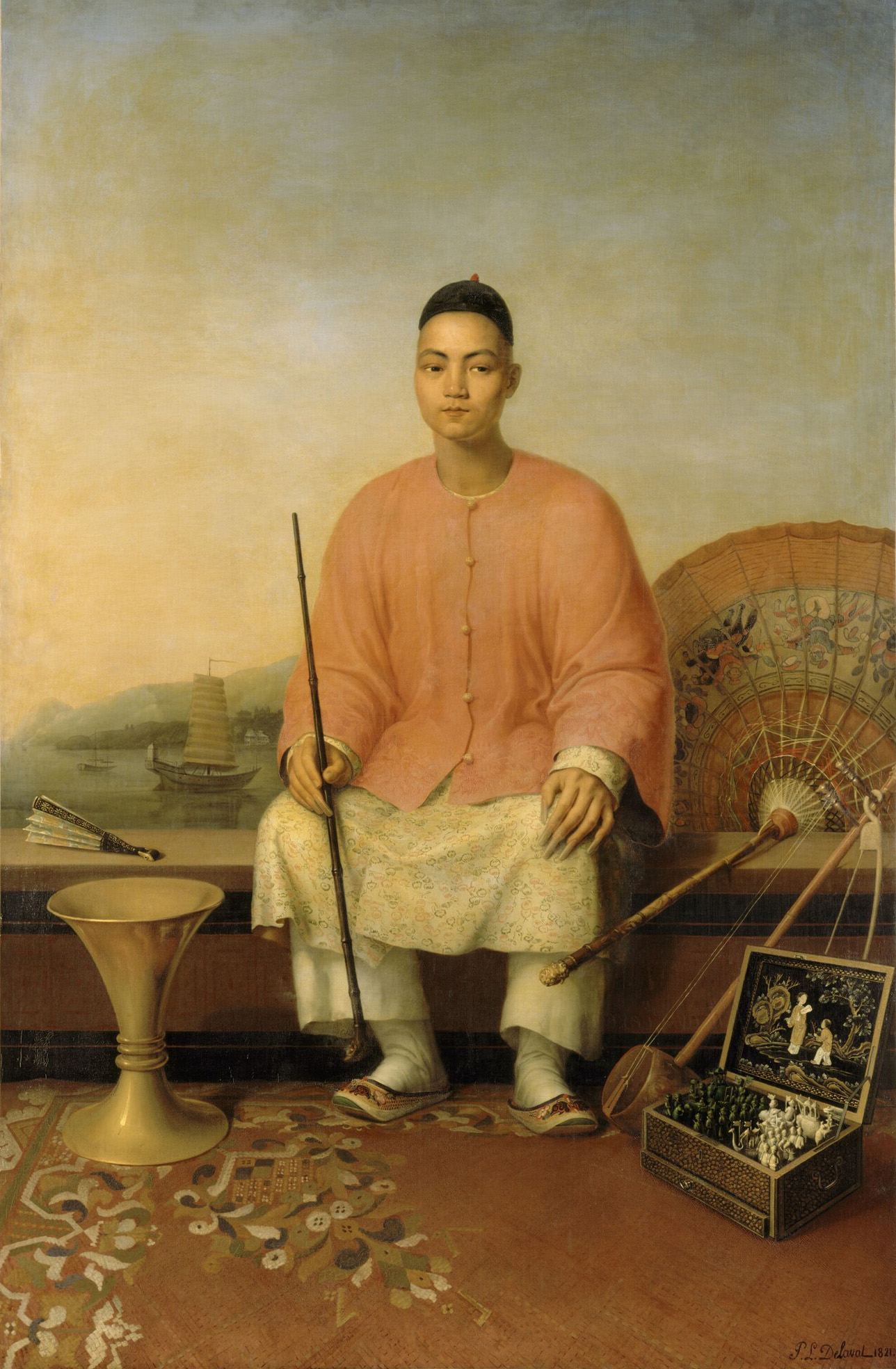
Delaval's 1821 portrait of Kan Gao, a Chinese worker on Cayenne, in a magua.

The tangzhuang is an adaption of the Manchu "horse jacket" (magua), a waist- or three-quarter-length front-opening jacket or surcoat. This was initially worn—usually in a dark blue color—by Manchu horsemen, but became mandatory for Han officials' clothing under the Qing Empire. Over time, it evolved from a protective apron for the changshan into an item of Chinese fashion in its own right and even a mark of imperial favor. Its use then spread among the common Han, including among the Chinese diaspora abroad.

Following the 1911 Xinhai Revolution and 1949 Communist victory in the Chinese Civil War, the "Mao suit" (Zhōngshān zhuāng) gradually displaced the changshan and magua in most contexts. After the fall of the Gang of Four in the late 1970s and the beginning of Deng Xiaoping's Opening Up Policy in the 1980s, traditional clothing began to experience a revival in mainland China. Variants of the magua became noticeably more common in Chinese fashion from the mid-1990s.

=== 2001 APEC Summit ===
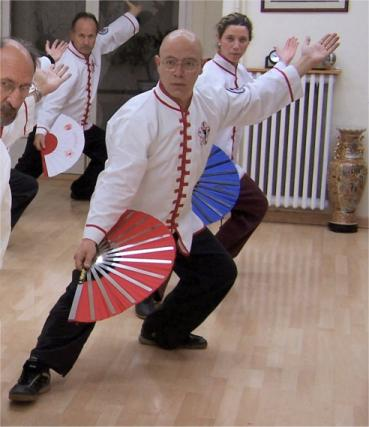
A class of western tai chi practitioners, clad in white tangzhuangs (2005)

In 1993, US president Bill Clinton tried to bring trade talks back on track by inviting the heads of the APEC member economies to personally attend what had until then been a ministerial conference. He requested leaders' clothes remain informal and presented each with a leather bomber jacket bearing the APEC logo as a memento. The next year, Indonesia followed suit and presented batik shirts; the world leaders then humored Suharto's request that they wear them for a group photo. The tradition developed that the summits' hosts would present traditional and representative clothes from their cultures, and the leaders would wear them on the last day of the conference as a show of solidarity.

Ahead of the first occasion of China's hosting the summit in 2001, state-run media acquainted the Chinese with the custom, prompting speculation as to what China's "traditional clothes" might be: Mao suits had been displaced by western-style suits; minority groups often had recognizable ethnic costumes but styles of Han clothing (hànfú) had varied from dynasty to dynasty, with the most recent Qing forms heavily influenced by the Manchus and their oppressive dress codes. Although these designs were among the 40 presented to the Chinese government over the span of a year, their foreign origin or political connotations led officials to select an "ambiguously traditional" design by Shanghainese clothiers Li Jianqin (李建秦, Lǐ Jiànqín) and Yu Ying (t 余鶯, s 余莺, Yú Yīng) and by five others at Qinyi (t 秦藝服飾, s 秦艺服饰, Qínyì Fúshì) and the Shanghai Garment Group (t 上海服裝集團, s 上海服装集团, Shànghǎi Fúzhuāng Jítuán).

The jackets given to the APEC leaders were a blend of Chinese motifs and western design, made from silk supposedly artificially enhanced to be stronger, softer, more wrinkle-resistant, more water-absorbent, and better ventilated, with longer-lasting and brighter colors. They featured cotton knotwork instead of buttons and a design of peonies surrounding the letters "APEC". The jackets were handmade but not personally sized; instead, they were fitted using stand-ins and body doubles, with a partially-completed backup available in case those measurements were mistaken. The leaders had a choice among scarlet, azure, green, brown, maroon, and black versions; each came in a matching silk bag adorned with the APEC logo and each had an off-white silk shirt to wear beneath it. The 20 attendees—the leaders of all the APEC member economies except "Chinese Taipei"—mostly opted for the red-and-black or blue-and-gold design and wore the jackets to their meetings at the Shanghai Science and Technology Museum on 21 October 2001 and for the "Leaders' Family Portrait" afterwards that closed the event.

=== Tangzhuang craze ===
The tangzhuang's use as the representative unisex Chinese clothing for the "Leaders' Family Portrait" immediately led to its more widespread popularity, spreading from Beijing to other large towns around the country as far afield as Lanzhou in Gansu by the next Chinese New Year. This "tangzhuang craze" (t 唐裝熱, s 唐装热, tángzhuāng rè) saw the tangzhuang and other traditional clothes become fashionable daily wear for both sexes, which gave a large boost to the domestic silk industry. The original designers left their original companies to start their own businesses to capitalize on their creation's popularity, but the fad was short-lived and most had moved on by 2004.

=== Subsequent history ===
Even after the end of its fad, the tangzhuang continues to have a place in Chinese fashion. It remained in common use among Jiang Zemin's clique and the nouveau riche, but more especially became a menswear staple on the mainland and abroad for traditional Chinese holidays alongside western and Mao-style suits.

The tangzhuang—and its perceived inauthenticity as ethnic clothing—is also credited by members of the hanfu movement with having inspired their cause and a revival of actual traditional Han clothing, despite the Chinese public's usual confusion about its origin. (Traditional Chinese fashions have been so long mixed with Manchu and western elements that Tang-style robes are confused with Japanese kimonos and Ming clothes with Korean hanboks.)

China used the "Tang suit jackets" again for its 2014 APEC summit, but with an updated style in maroon, green, and blue that The Guardian unflatteringly compared to Star Trek uniforms.

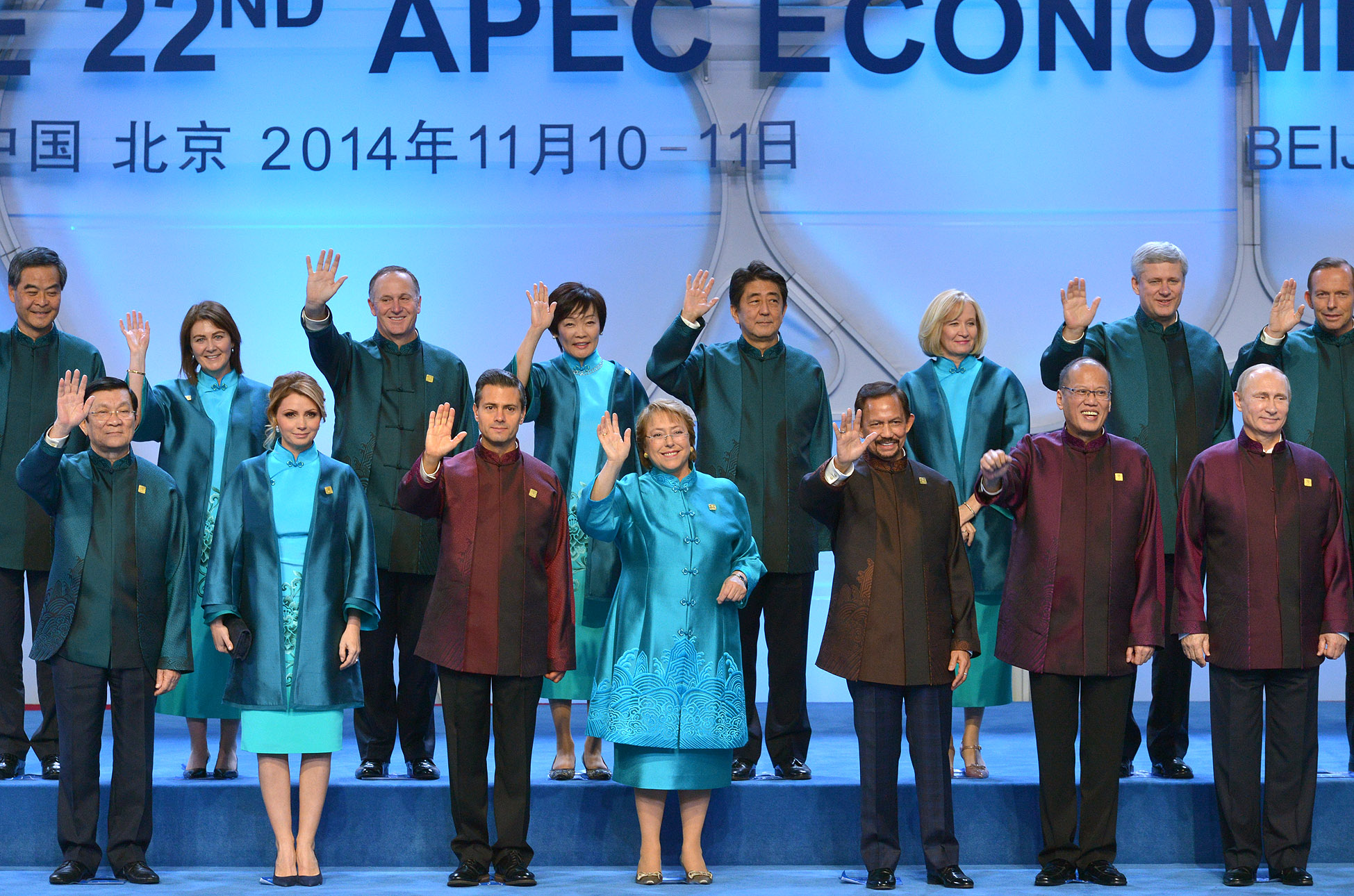
Shinzo Abe, Vladimir Putin, and others in the 2014 version of the tangzhuang

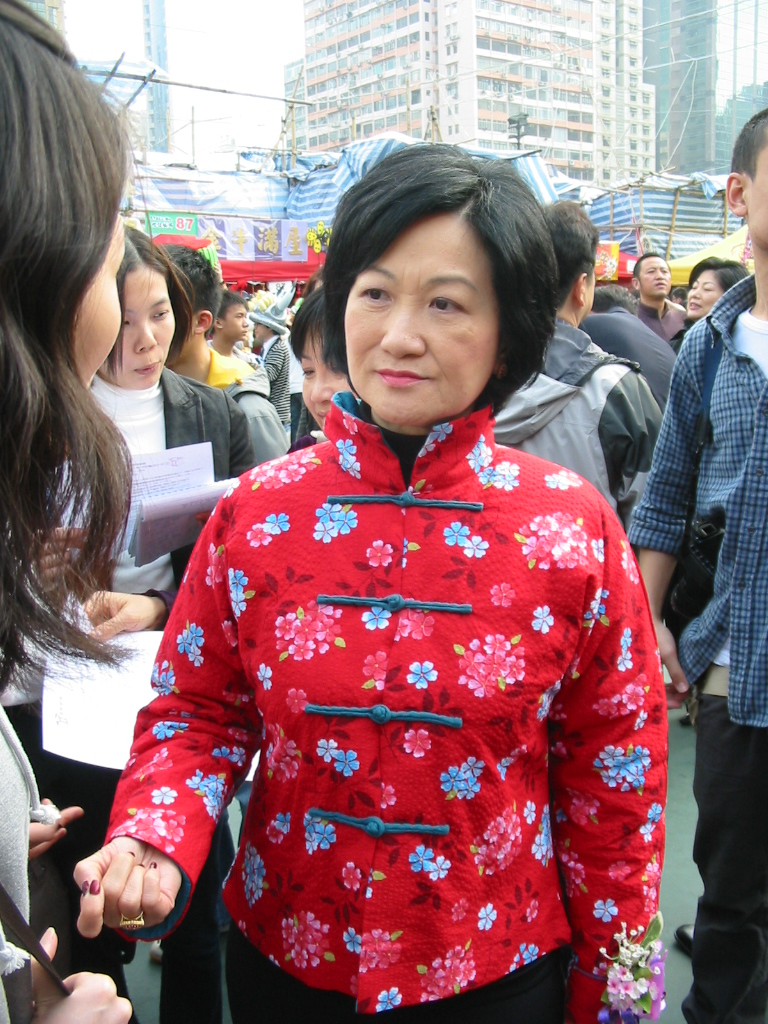
Hong Kong politician Regina Ip at the Chinese New Year fair in Victoria Park (2009)

== Style ==
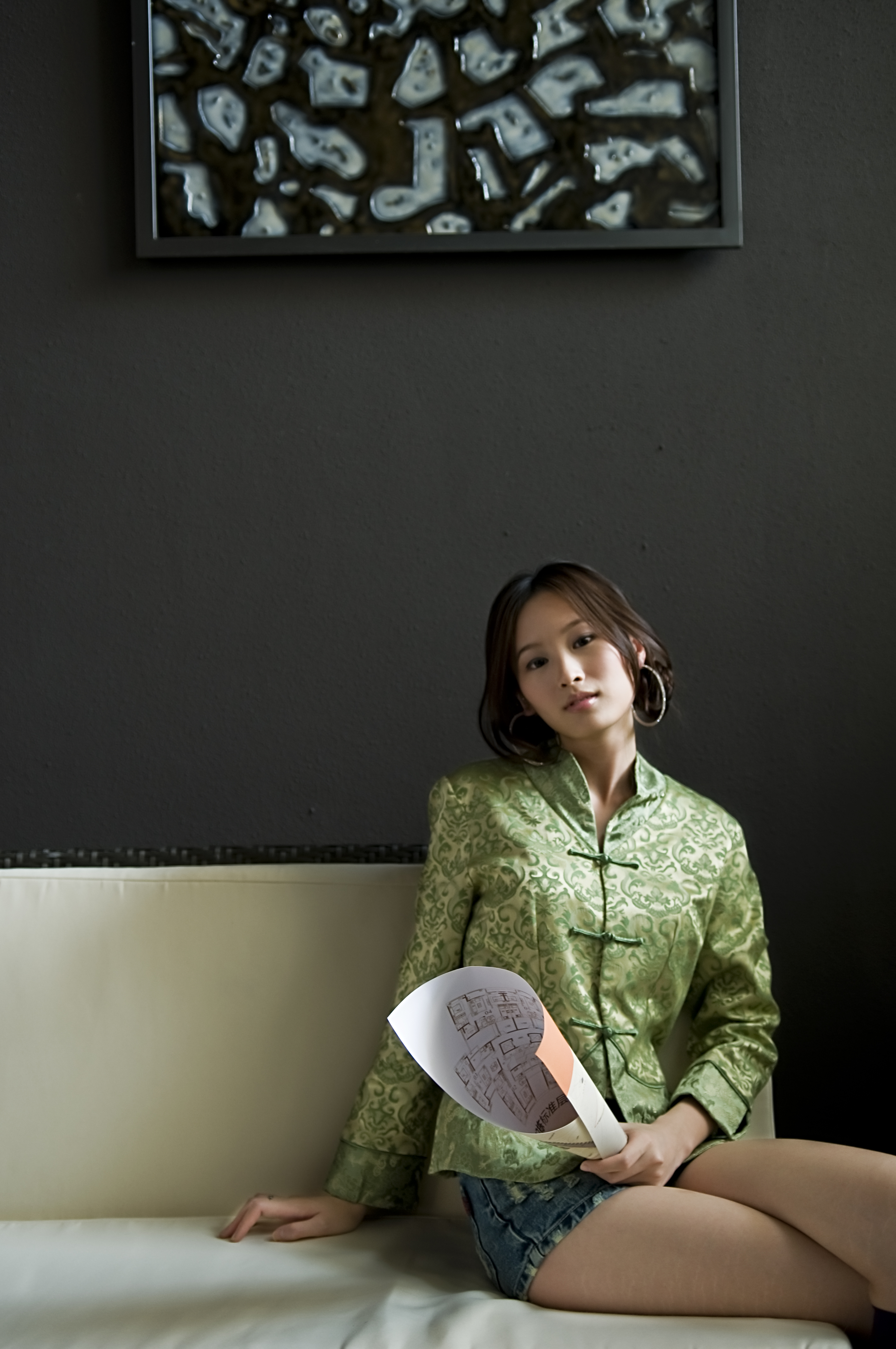
A model in a tangzhuang (2009)

The APEC jackets were intended to reflect "both traditional Chinese flavor and modern ideals". They have straight Mandarin collars, similar to those on the changshan and magua that gave the style its name. Unlike the traditional 2D "flat-cutting" (平面裁剪, píngmiàn cáijiǎn) process used to create those garments, which tends to produce a baggy and ill-fitted look, tangzhuangs are made using the 3D "solid-cutting" (t 立體裁剪, s 立体裁剪, lìtǐ cáijiǎn) process developed in Europe. In particular, they employ draping, darts, and set-in sleeves cut separately from the rest of the main garment, which give them a more fitted look than traditional Chinese designs. The original version also employed shoulder pads to give a stronger silhouette.

Although the APEC jackets were pointedly made using artificial fibers, silk tangzhuang have since outsold those made from cotton and other materials. Tangzhuang are available in a variety of colors, although the most common are red or blue. The brocade is often decorated with a repeated pattern of embroidery. Common designs involve the repetition of auspicious Chinese characters such as fú (福, "happiness") or shòu (t 壽, s 寿, "longevity") for good luck and good wishes. Tangzhuang are usually fastened with decorative knotwork instead of buttons.

Tangzhuang are usually considered menswear but they may also be worn by women, as by New Zealand's prime minister Helen Clark at APEC 2001.

== See also ==
- Color in Chinese culture
- Ru—Chinese upper garment
