= Magua (clothing) =

Style of jacket

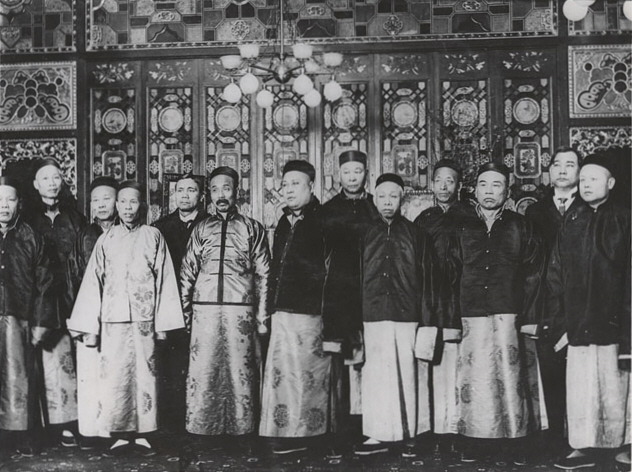
- Men of the Chinese Consolidated Benevolent Association wearing the Magua.
- Type: Jacket
- Place of origin: Chinese-speaking world, China

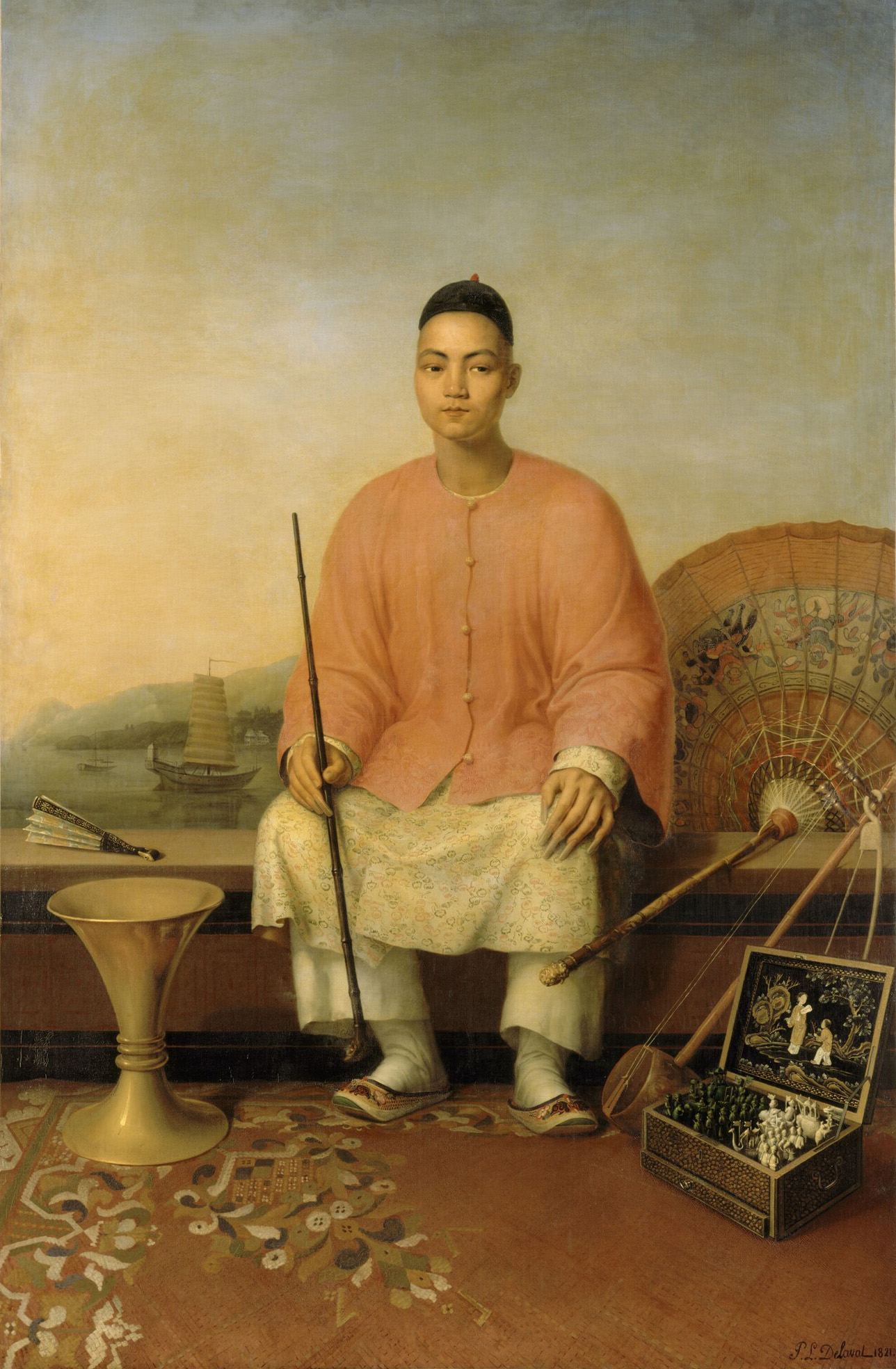
A Chinese laborer wearing a magua painted by Pierre-Louis Delaval

The magua (Manchu: ᠣᠯᠪᠣ olbo, simplified Chinese: 马褂; traditional Chinese: 馬褂) was a style of jacket worn by males during the Qing dynasty (1644–1911), designed to be worn together with and over the manshi changshan (滿式長衫) as part of the Qizhuang. Magua is at waist length, with five disc buttons on the front and slightly short, wide sleeves. The garment was available in a number of styles: singlet (Chinese: 单; pinyin: dān), clip (Chinese: 夹; pinyin: jiá), leather (Chinese: 皮; pinyin: pí), cotton yarn (Chinese: 纱; pinyin: shā), quilted (棉; mián) and others. It was worn by Manchu people throughout China from the reign of the Qing Shunzhi Emperor (r. 1643–1661) until the time of the Kangxi Emperor, (r. 1661–1722), whence it became popular throughout Qing China.

Rendered literally in English as "riding jacket", the magua had its origins as a simple tabard-like item of clothing intended to protect the changshan during riding and normal everyday activities. However, with time the magua itself became more elaborate, becoming for officials part of their uniform of office; one variation of the magua, the imperial yellow jacket, becoming an indication of Imperial approval of an individual.

The magua is considered the predecessor of the balsam jacket (鳳仙裝, fèngxiān zhuāng) and the tangzhuang.

== In Chinese culture ==
=== Tujia minority ===
Tujia is one of the 56 recognized ethnic groups in China. Both men and women mainly wear skirts and jackets, favoring colors such as black and blue. After the 1730s, men and women started to wear clothes that would help differentiate their gender. The magua, buttoned at the center front, is worn by men over the blue long robe. It can be worn formally in black or informally in colors of red, green or gray, with wide trousers usually in a different color, often white. Men would tie sashes around their waist band to help them carry tools or accessories and wear white or black turbans. Women, on the other hand, wore wide short sleeved, long gowns that button on the left side, with decorative elements at the edge of the sleeves and the collar, accompanied with a bafu luoqun (or skirt of eight widths) made of red and black checked silk, embroidered with flowers or other designs.

Magua is also associated with social status, as men tried to incorporate the dress etiquettes from the Han period. The magua is accompanied by fur coats, silk gowns and skull caps. By the early 1950s, the popularity of the style decreased.

== Types of Magua ==
- Huang magua (yellow magua)

== Regional variations ==
=== Burmese taikpon ===
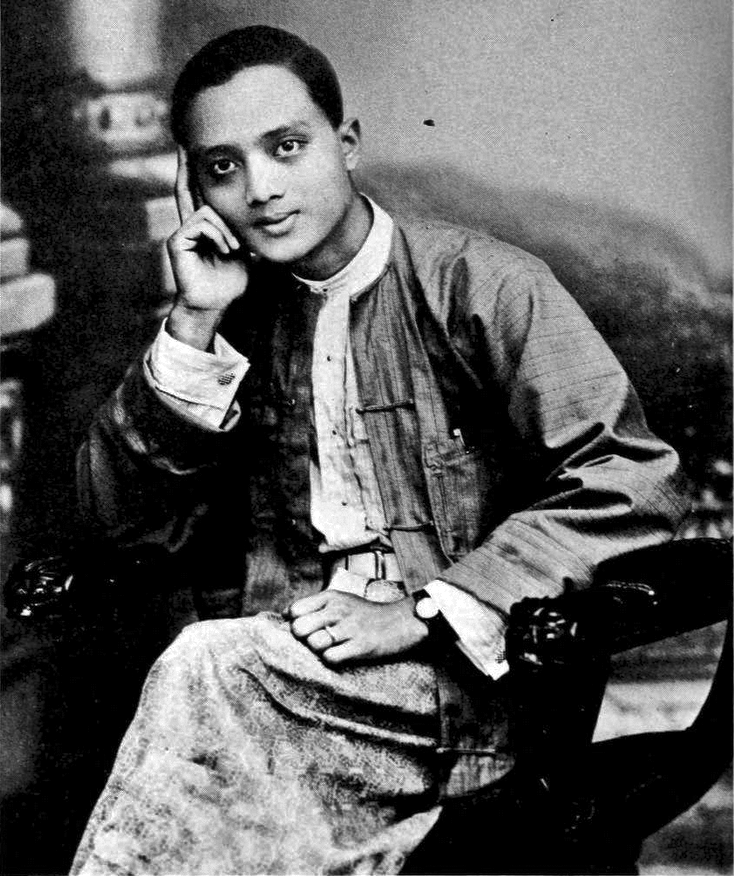
U Thant dressed in a taikpon over a collarless shirt.

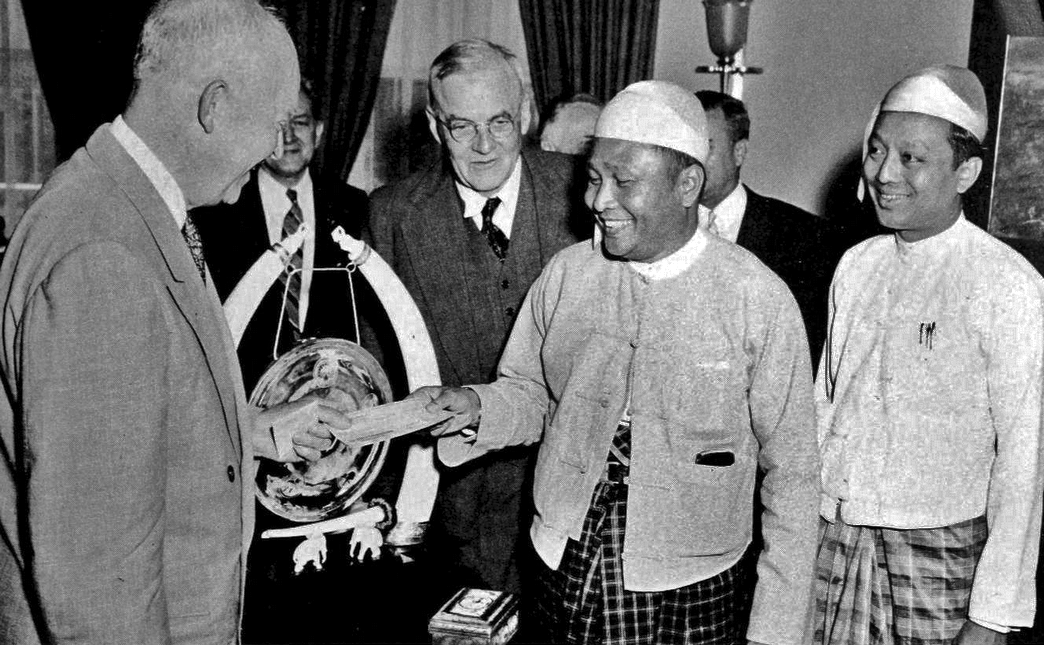
Burmese politicians dressed in taikpon.

The taikpon eingyi (တိုက်ပုံအင်္ကျီ), a traditional jacket for Burmese men, is a descendant of the magua. This costume began to gain currency during the early British rule in Burma and became a requisite article of traditional formal attire during the colonial era.

=== Korean magoja ===
The magoja, a type of long jacket worn with hanbok, the traditional clothing of Korea, is a descendant of the magua, having been introduced to Koreans after Heungseon Daewongun, father of King Gojong, returned from political exile in Manchuria in 1887.

== See also ==
- Qizhuang - Manchu clothing
- Burmese clothing
- Cheongsam
- Chinese clothing
- Tangzhuang
