= Changshan =

Men's traditional clothing in late imperial China

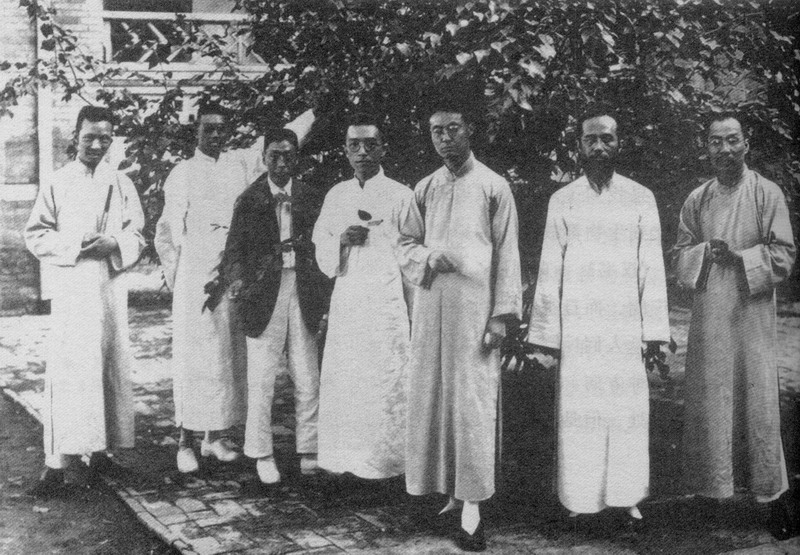
- Men wearing changshan for Journal of Sinological Studies in 1924.

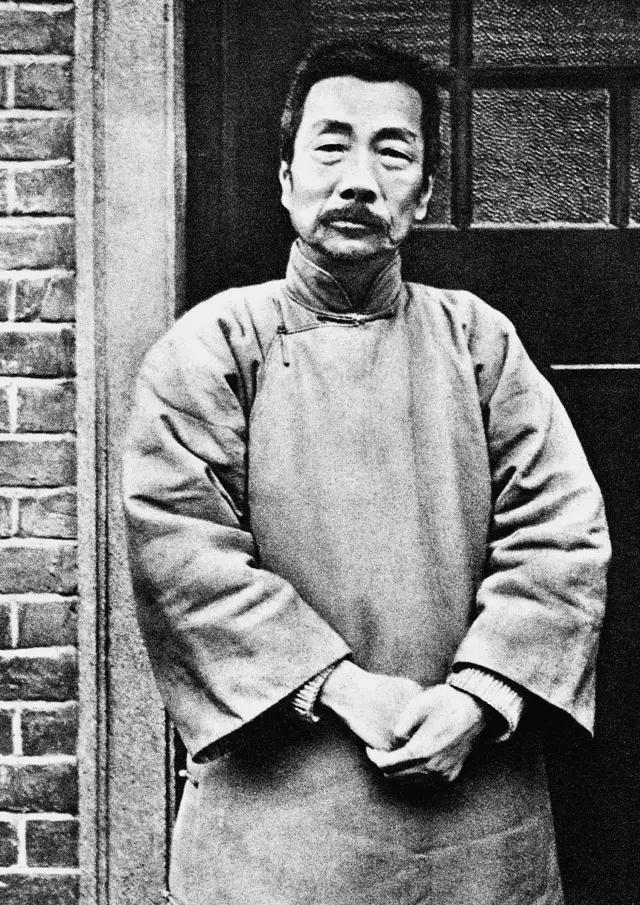
- Writer Lu Xun wears changshan.
- Chinese: 長衫
- Literal meaning: Long shirt
Transcriptions
Standard Mandarin
- Hanyu Pinyin: Chángshān

Changpao
- Chinese: 長袍
- Literal meaning: Long robe
Transcriptions
Standard Mandarin
- Hanyu Pinyin: chángpáo

Dagua
- Chinese: 大褂
- Literal meaning: Great jacket
Transcriptions
Standard Mandarin
- Hanyu Pinyin: Dàguà

Changshan (Chinese: 長衫; pinyin: chángshān; lit. 'long shirt'; [ʈʂʰǎŋʂán]), also known as changpao (Chinese: 長袍; pinyin: chángpáo; lit. 'Long robe'), and dagua (Chinese: 大褂; pinyin: Dàguà; lit. 'Great jacket'), is a form of paofu, Chinese robe, which was derived from the Qing dynasty qizhuang, the traditional dress of the Manchu people, which were worn by Manchu men. The changshan was actually developed by the Han Chinese through the modification of their own Ming dynasty's Hanfu by adopting some Manchu men's clothing elements in one of their Hanfu changshan. In function, the changshan is considered the male equivalent of the women's cheongsam (also known as qipao). The changshan was often worn by men with a magua, also commonly translated as riding jacket in English.

== Terminology ==
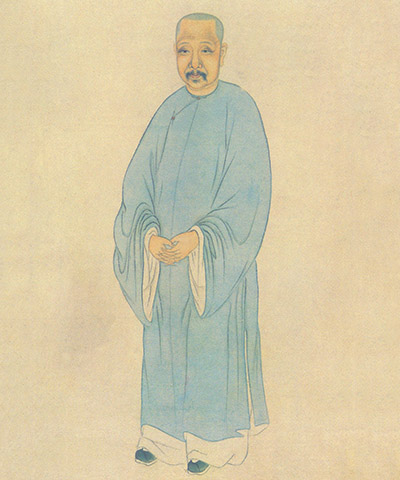
Portrait of scholar Bi Yuan wearing changshan.

=== General term ===
The term changshan is composed of two Chinese characters: chang (長) which can literally be translated as 'long' in length and shan (衫), which literally means 'shirt'. The term changpao is also composed of the Chinese character chang and the Chinese pao (袍), which literally means 'robe'. As general terms used in the broad sense, the changshan and changpao can refer to any form of long shirt and long robes respectively.

=== Specific term ===
The Mandarin Chinese word changshan is cognate with the Cantonese term Cheongsam (長衫). This was then borrowed into English as cheongsam.

Unlike the Mandarin term, however, the chèuhngsàam can refer to both male and female garments. In Hong Kong the term is frequently used to refer to the female garment, cheongsam, rather than the male garment changshan.

Because of the long British presence in Hong Kong, that local usage has become reflected in the meaning of cheongsam in English, which refers exclusively to the female garment.

== Origins and development ==
What is now known as the Chinese changshan was developed by the Han Chinese during the Qing dynasty. The Qing dynasty Chinese changshan started to be worn by the Han Chinese after the Manchu conquest. The Chinese changshan was actually a modified version of the changshan worn in the Ming dynasty (1368–1644 AD), the preceding dynasty before the Qing dynasty, and was modelled after the Manchu's men's changpao.

Chinese changshan and Manchu neitao
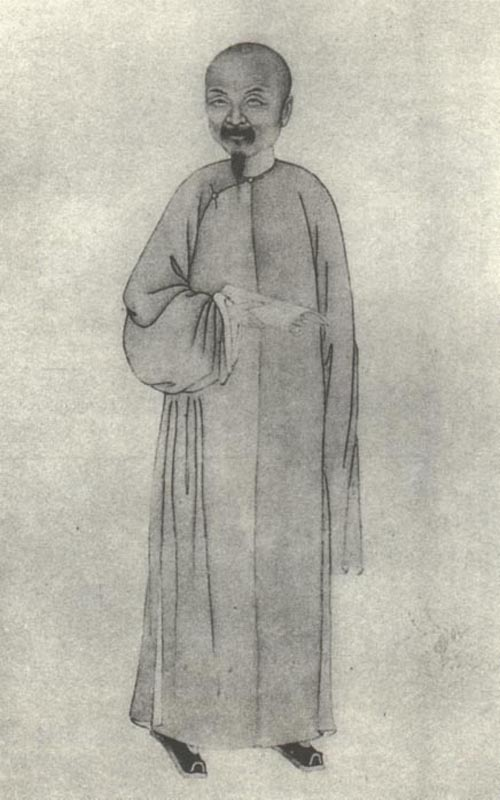
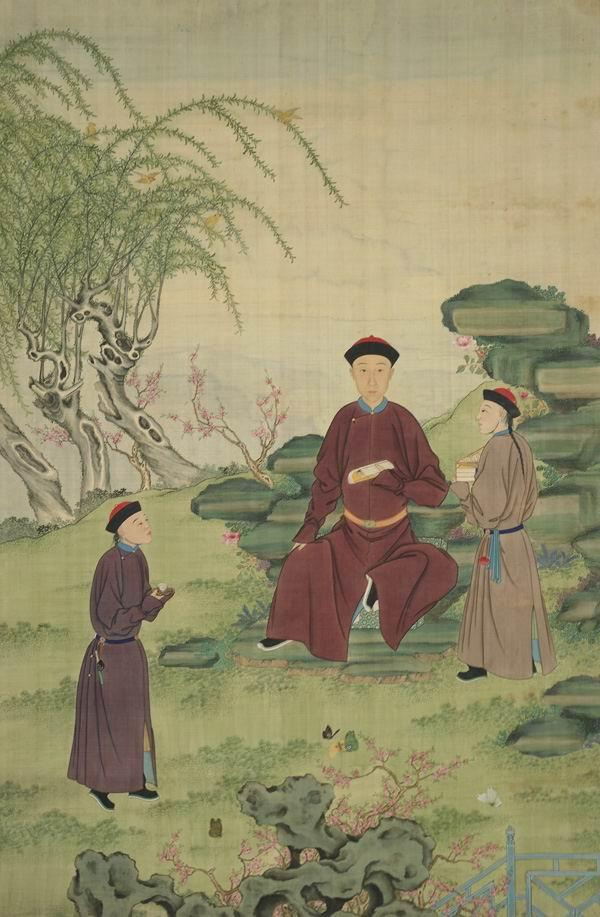
Differences between the Chinese changshan (left) and Manchu neitao (right), Qing dynasty

Manchu men wore a type of changpao which reflected its equestrian origins, which was originally designed for horseback riding, known as neitao, which was characterized by two pair of slits (one slit on each side, one slit on the back, and one slit on the front) which increased ease of movement when mounting and dismounting horses, a pianjin collar (a collar which curved like the alphabet《S》), and the sleeve cuffs known as matixiu (Chinese: 马蹄袖; pinyin: mǎtíxiù; lit. 'horse hoof cuff').

The Han Chinese thus adopted certain Manchu elements when modifying their Ming dynasty changshan, such as by slimming their changshan, by adopting the pianjin collar of the Manchu, and by using buttons and loops at the neck and sides. Despite the shared similarities with Manchu's neitao, the Chinese changshan differed structurally from the Manchu's neitao. The Chinese changshan only has two slits on the sides lacking the central front and back slits and lacked the presence of the matixiu cuffs; the sleeves were also longer than the ones found in the neitao.

== History ==
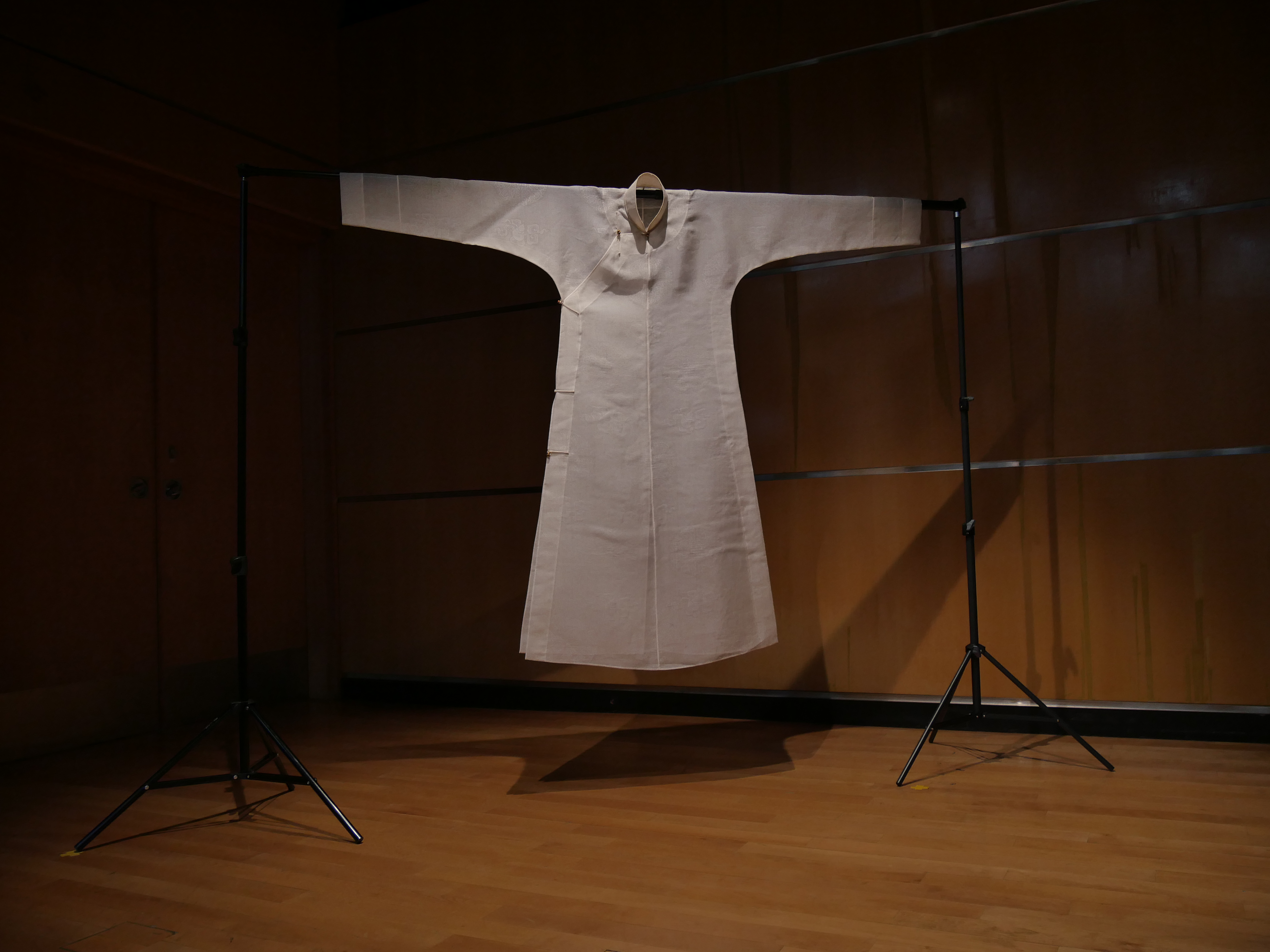
Changshan displayed at Hong Kong Museum of History

The precursors of both the changshan and the qipao were introduced to China during the Qing dynasty (17th–20th centuries). The Manchus in 1636 ordered that all Han Chinese should adopt the Manchu's hairstyle as well as their attire of dress or face harsh punishment including death penalty. However, by the time of the Qianlong Emperor, however, the adoption of Manchu clothing dressing code was only required to the scholar-official elites and did not apply to the entire male population. The court dress of the Qing dynasty also had to follow the attire of the Manchu people; however, commoner Han men and women were still allowed to wear the hanfu under some circumstances and/or if they fell under the exemptions of the Tifayifu policy. The order of wearing Manchu's hairstyle however still remained as a fundamental rule for all Chinese men.

Over time, the commoner Han men adopted the changshan while Han women continued to the wear the hanfu predominantly in the style of aoqun. The traditional Chinese Hanfu-style of clothing for men was gradually replaced. Over time, the Manchu-style of male dress gained popularity among Han men.

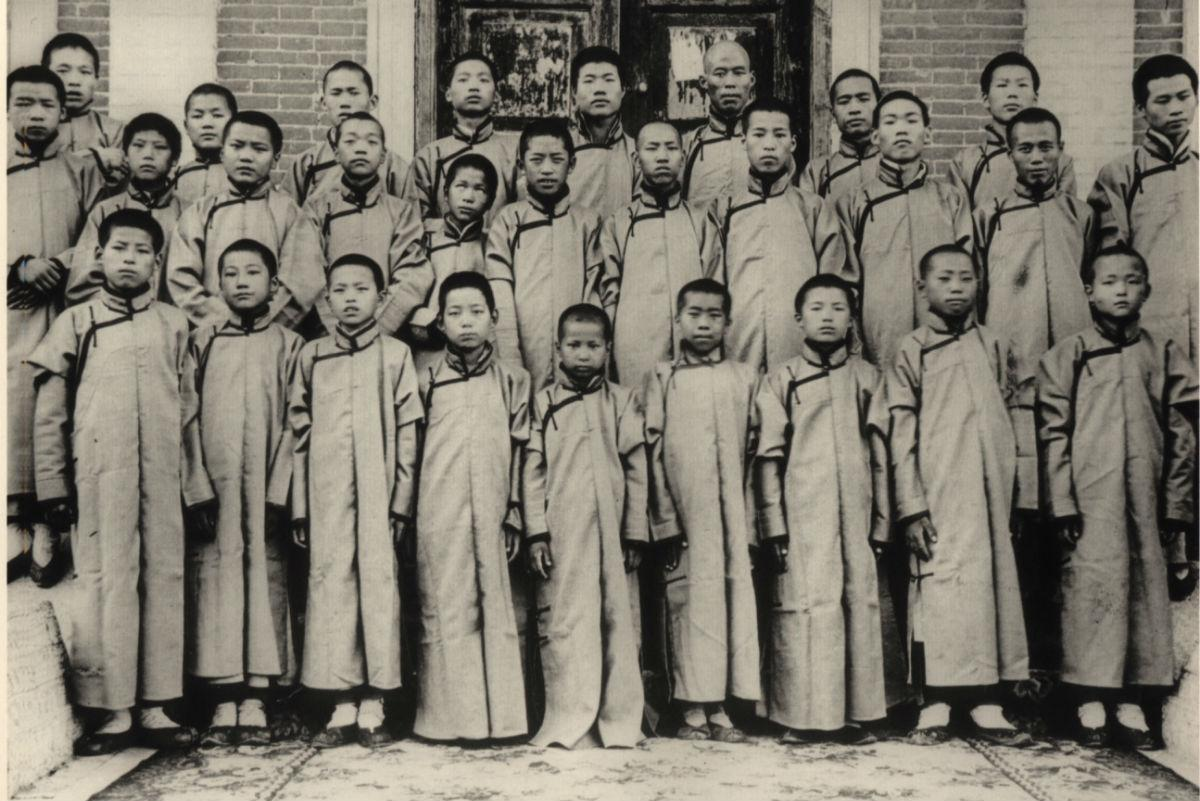
Changshan worn by students at a Catholic School in Hanzhong.

Changshan was considered formal dress for Chinese men before Western-style suits were widely adopted in China. The male changshan could be worn under a western overcoat, and topped with a fedora and scarf. This combination expressed an East Asian modernity in the early 20th century.

The 1949 Communist Revolution replaced the wearing of changshan and other traditional clothing with the Zhongshan suit. Shanghainese emigrants and refugees carried the fashion to Hong Kong, where it remained popular, but over time it was overtaken by western fashions. After the 1970s, Shanghai and elsewhere in mainland China, many people have revived wearing the Shanghainese changshan.

== Use of changshan ==
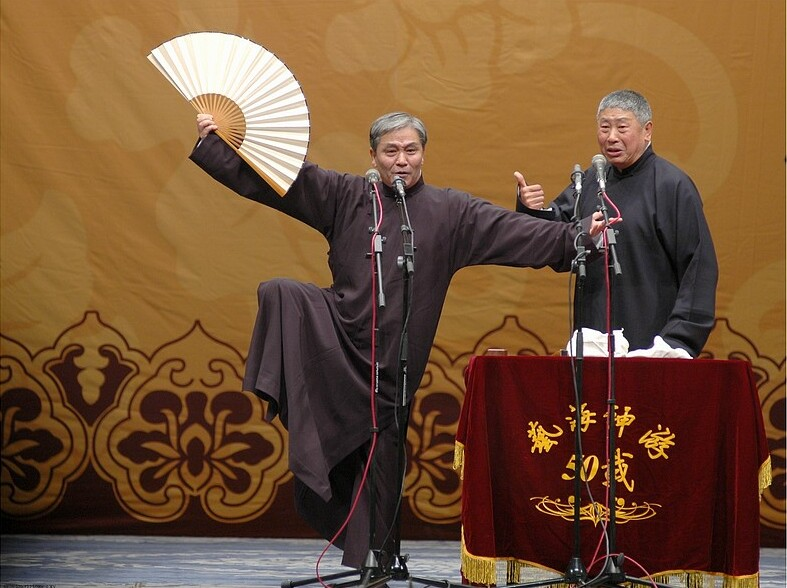
Changshan is often worn by traditional performers, such as for xiangsheng.

Changshan are traditionally worn for formal pictures, weddings, and other formal Chinese events. A black changshan, along with a rounded black hat, was, and sometimes still is, the burial attire for Chinese men. Changshan are not often worn today in mainland China, except during traditional Chinese celebrations but, with the revival of some traditional clothing in urban mainland China, the Shanghainese style functions as a stylish party dress (cf. Mao suit).

== See also ==
- Magua (clothing)
- Qizhuang
- Tangzhuang
- Hanfu
