= Chinese clothing =

Traditional and modern dress in China

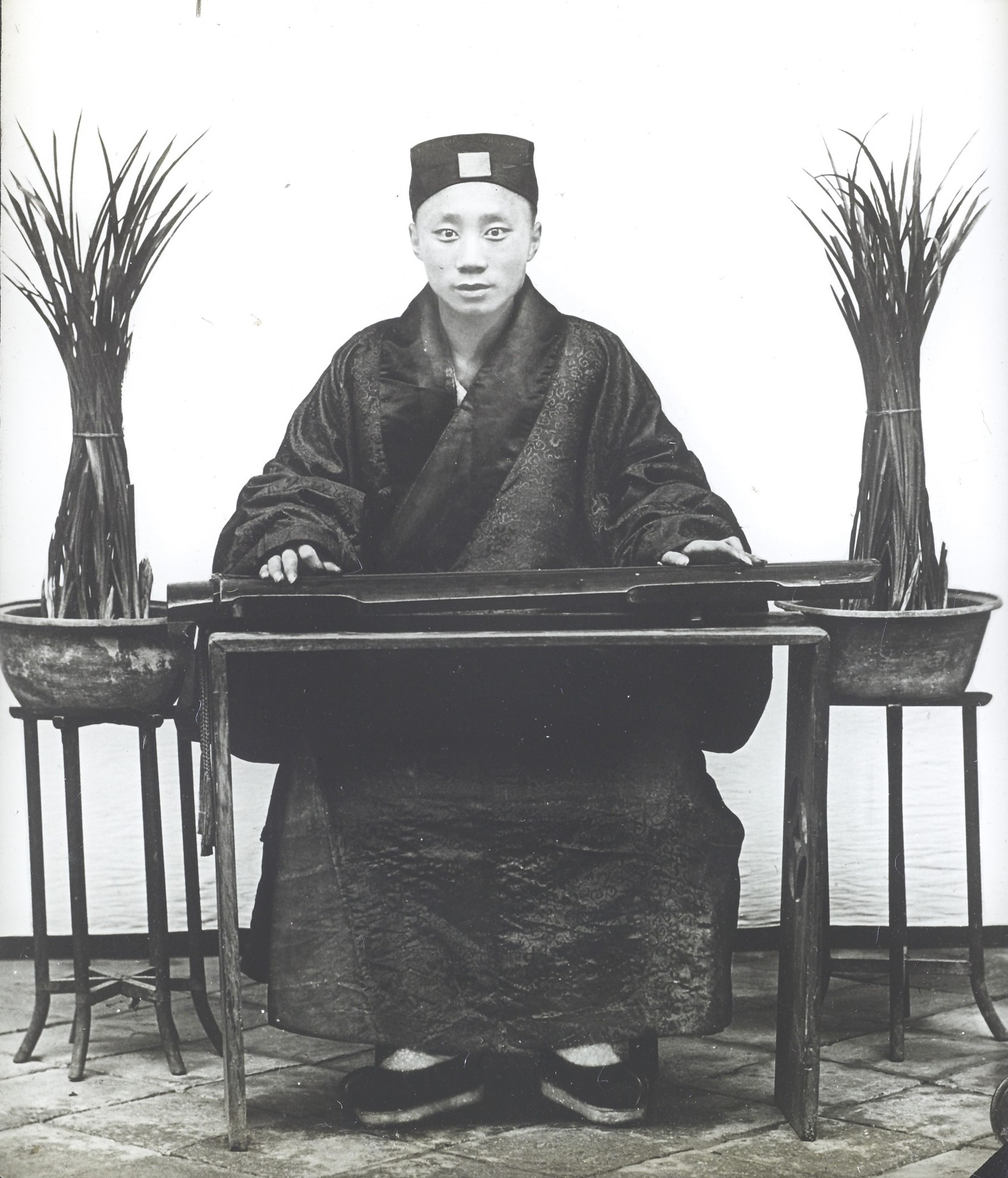
1906- 1912 photo of an upper-class Chinese man wearing traditional Chinese clothing.

Chinese clothing varies depending on social class, regional diversity, and practical function. Historically, each dynasty maintained specific styles, colours, and forms that reflected social rank and relationships. Ancient Chinese attire also used various textile, dyeing, and embroidery techniques.

== Origin ==
Ancient Chinese mythology credits the invention of clothing to the Yellow Emperor, Huangdi, and his wife, Leizu. Distinct costumes used in military activity and ceremonial rites contributed to the development of a formal clothing system.

Archaeological evidence traces clothing to the late Paleolithic period. Because ancient shoes were often made from animal skin, the Chinese words for "leather" and "shoe" share an etymological link. It has been speculated that early shoes were made by cutting animal skins into rough foot shapes and joining them with thin leather strips.

=== Upper cave site ===
A bone needle and 141 ornaments made of stone, bone, shell, and tooth were discovered at the Upper Cave of the Zhoukoudian Peking Man site and dated to 19,000 years old. Archaeologists found seven small stone beads and 125 perforated animal teeth, many of which exhibited marks of long-term wear. Bones interred in the lower chamber of the cave bore traces of hematite powder.

=== Neolithic Age ===
During the Neolithic period, people used spinning wheels to weave thread and wore linen clothing. A waist loom with a cylindrical back loop, that formed a natural weaving mouth, was found at the Hemudu dig site in Yuyao. Silk production also began during this period, and clothing materials shifted to artificially woven fabrics. Cloak-style garments such as headscarves and drapes became typical attire. These replaced Paleolithic clothing forms and served to distinguish between social classes. Neolithic pottery also depicts the use crowns, boots, headgear, and other accessories.

=== Shang dynasty ===
In the Shang dynasty, clothing materials included leather, silk, ramie, and kudzu. The upper class wore dyed silk and leather, while the lower class used hemp, ramie, and kudzu due to limited silk access. As textile technology advanced, artisans produced fine silk, jacquard patterns, and ribbed yarn on warp looms, dyeing fabrics in deep colors.

=== Western Zhou dynasty ===
During the Western Zhou dynasty, positions such as "Si Fu" and "Nei Si Fu" were established to oversee royal attire. Records indicate that the Chinese system of crowns and dress originated in the Xia and Shang dynasties. Artifacts from the Zhou dynasty show distinct upper and lower garments.

=== Qin and Han dynasties ===
During the Qin and Han dynasties, women's clothing typically featured long, wide, loose sleeves and high-heeled clogs. Noblewomen also wore a decorative arm scarf called the Jingguo.

During this period, fashion diversified. According to the Miscellaneous Records of the Western Capital, after Zhao Feiyan became Empress, her sister commissioned matching upper and lower garments for her. Zhao Feiyan's "Yunying Purple Skirt," also called the "Liuxian Skirt," was a tribute from South Vietnam resembling modern pleated skirts.

=== Sui and Tang dynasties ===
During the Sui and Tang dynasties, a garment originally intended for women, known as the "half-arm" originated at court, spread widely, and was later also worn by men. Long scarves were also popular; these were woven from gauze and decorated with painted or powdered silver and gold flowers. One end was fixed to the half-arm's chest strap, draped over the shoulder, and wound between the arms. Tang women used numerous types of hair accessories, and typically wore floral shoes made of brocade, colored silk, or leather.

=== Song dynasty ===
==== Song official uniform ====
Hanfu worn during the Song dynasty usually fell into three types: official attire, casual attire, and traditional attire. Official uniforms were made mainly of silk. Due to the old Five Dynasties system, the government would brocade robes to high-ranking ministers annually, divided into seven colors, including the Lingjiu ball-patterned brocade robe.

Official attire colors followed the Tang system: purple for third grade and above, red for fifth grade and above, and green for seventh grade and above. The style resembled the long-sleeved robe of the late Tang dynasty, worn with a flat-winged black gauze hat known as the straight-footed futou, headwear reserved for rulers and officials. As in the Tang system, officials permitted to wear purple or crimson were required to carry a "fish bag" at the waist containing a gold, silver, or copper fish indicating their rank.

=== Yuan dynasty ===

Ethnic integration was prominent in the clothing of the Yuan dynasty (founded by Genghis Khan in 1206, whose Khanate became ethnically dominated by Mongols after the conquest of Western Xia and Jin). Prolonged warfare from ethnic conflict damaged the textile and handicraft industries, and the palace dress system continued to follow that of the Song dynasty until 1321, under Yuan Yingzong, when a style based on ancient clothing traditions was introduced: an upper garment joined to a lower one, fitted at the top and short below, with pleats gathered at the waist and a large string of beads hung from the shoulder at the back. This costume was known as zhisun or, among the Han, as "one color clothes".

=== Ming dynasty ===
After the Yuan dynasty, the Ming dynasty restored Han clothing traditions, and its founder Zhu Yuanzhang re-established the Hanfu system. The emperor wore a black veil folded over a scarf, with wings standing up at the back. Early Ming regulations called for reviving Tang-style clothing and headgear. Court dress followed Tang styles except that the crown for advancing scholars was changed to the Liang crown, and new styles such as the Zhongjing crown were introduced.

Since the Tang and Song dynasties, dragon robes and the color yellow had been reserved for the imperial family, and purple had been considered a mark of high official rank since the Southern and Northern Dynasties. In the Ming dynasty, red (zhu) was adopted as the official color because it matched the emperor's surname, while purple was dropped from official dress.

Officials' uniforms consisted of a futou headpiece and a round-necked robe. The futou, lacquered black with short, wide flaps, was known as the Wusha hat and could not be worn by non-officials. Rank was indicated by robe color and by a square silk patch, about 40–50 centimeters wide and embroidered with a distinct design, sewn onto the chest and back. Civil officials' patches depicted birds and military officials' depicted beasts, each in nine grades. Python robes, flying-fish robes, and bullfighting robes were awarded for merit. The python design showed a four-clawed dragon, the flying-fish design added fins to its tail, and the bullfighting design added curved horns to its head. Officials of the highest rank also wore jade belts. Round-necked robes were differentiated by the length of the garment and the size of the sleeves, with longer robes denoting greater seniority.

Wives and mothers of officials who held titles wore red long-sleeved dresses and various styles of xiapei. Upper-class women also wore high-heeled shoes, made with either an inner or an outer raised sole.

=== Qing dynasty ===
During the Qing dynasty, the government enforced the shaving of the head and a change in dress. In 1652, the Shunzhi Emperor's ninth year, the "dress and color" ordinance abolished the crowns, gowns, and other Ming-style Han clothing, though Manchu dress retained textile patterns from Ming garments. Ming-dynasty men wore their hair in a bun, with loose robes, stockings, and shallow shoes, while in the Qing dynasty, men shaved the front of the head and wore a queue hanging down the back, along with narrow horseshoe-sleeved robes, tight socks, and deep boots. Distinctions between official and commoner dress still persisted under both dynasties.

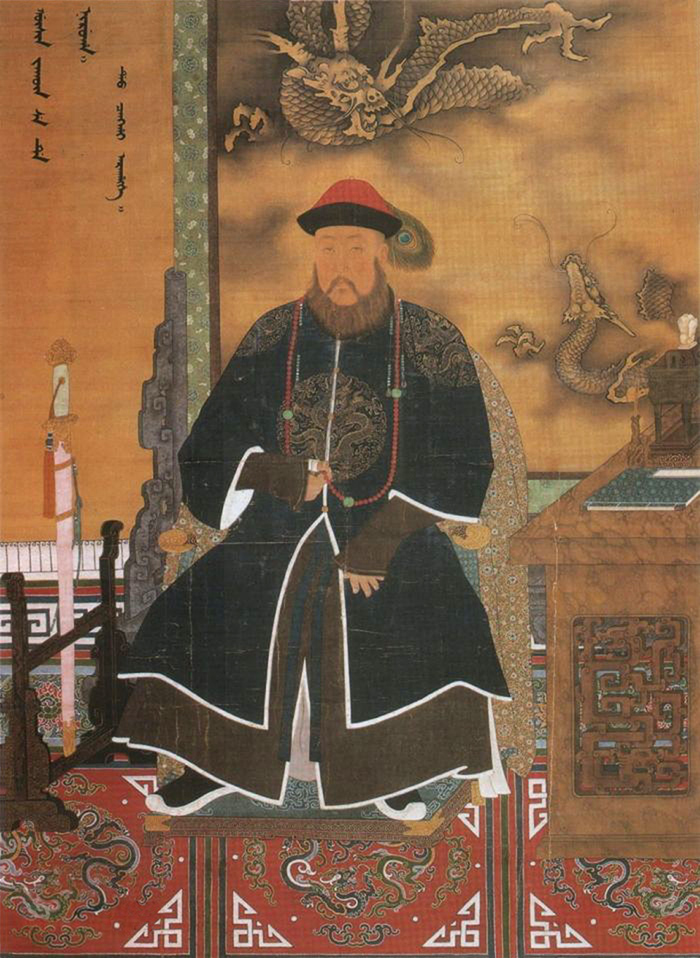

== Republic of China ==
The Republic of China period saw a rise in Western influence on Chinese fashion, and traditional clothing, such as hanfu, declined in daily use.

=== Cheongsam ===
The cheongsam, a traditional Chinese women's dress, emerged in the 1920s. In 1929, the Republic of China government's Regulations on the System of Clothing designated the cheongsam, along with the traditional jacket and skirt, as women's dress.

=== Zhongshan suit / Mao suit ===
The Zhongshan suit is a four-pocket garment with a stand-up lapel and pocket flaps, developed from European, American, Japanese student, and Chinese clothing styles. The Nationalist Government declared it the legal uniform in April 1929, and after the 1950s it became standard dress for both national leaders and ordinary citizens.

Mao Zedong wore a variant of the suit, known in the West as the Mao suit, when he was elected Chairman of the Central People's Government at the 1949 founding ceremony of the People's Republic on Tiananmen Square. Compared to the Republican-era Zhongshan suit, the 1950s Mao suit had a larger neckline and lapel. Soong Ching-ling, Sun Yat-sen's widow, promoted the cheongsam as standard female dress, while clothing regarded as outdated or backward was banned.

At the first National People's Congress in 1954, men commonly wore the Zhongshan suit, while women wore the Lenin suit, a Soviet-inspired double-breasted style with a wide collar that folded down into two small pointed lapels, a cloth belt, two rows of three buttons, and slanted pockets, usually in gray or blue khaki.

During the Destruction of the Four Olds campaign in 1964, items associated with Western or traditional culture, including jeans, high heels, Western-style coats, ties, jewelry, cheongsams, and long hair, were treated by Red Guards as symbols of bourgeois wealth. People seen wearing them in public risked beatings or other punishment, and such items were sometimes thrown into the streets.

== Modern fashion ==
Fashion styles in China have diversified since 2023, with trends such as "New Chinese style" gaining popularity. Traditional garments such as hanfu and the Tang suit have also remained popular. Hanfu turnover grew 376% year-on-year and show-clothes turnover grew 212%, while the number of men's Tang suit consumers increased by more than 90%.

Hong Kong brand Shanghai Tang bases its designs on historical Chinese clothing, reviving 1920s and 1930s styles in bright colors.

In 2000, dudou-inspired blouses appeared in the summer collections of Versace and Miu Miu, after which the style was adopted in China as outerwear.

For the 2012 Hong Kong Sevens tournament, sportswear brand Kukri Sports and Hong Kong retailer G.O.D. produced merchandise including traditional Chinese jackets and cheongsam-inspired polo shirts for women.

== Gallery ==
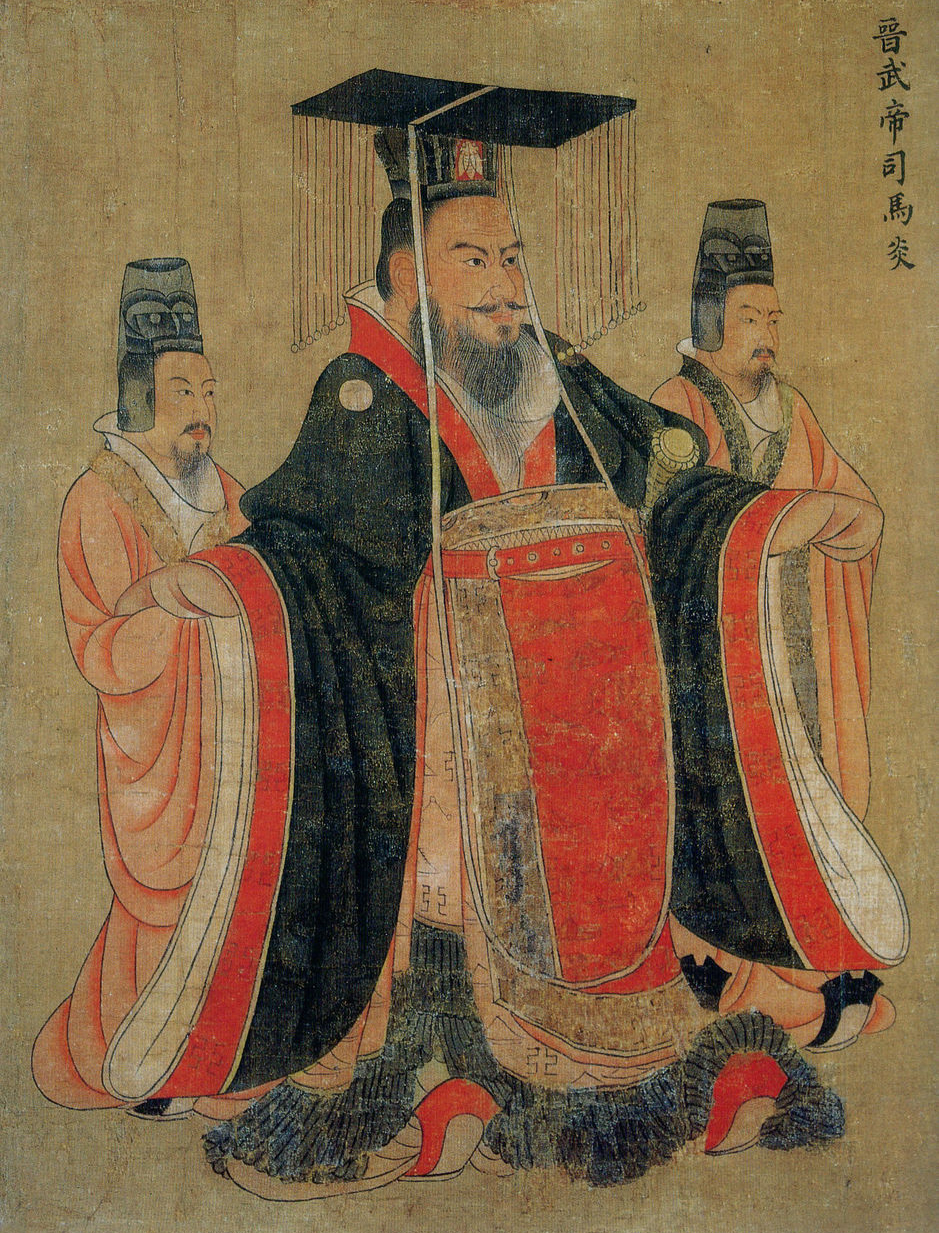
Emperor Wu of Jìn, by Yan Liben (600–673)

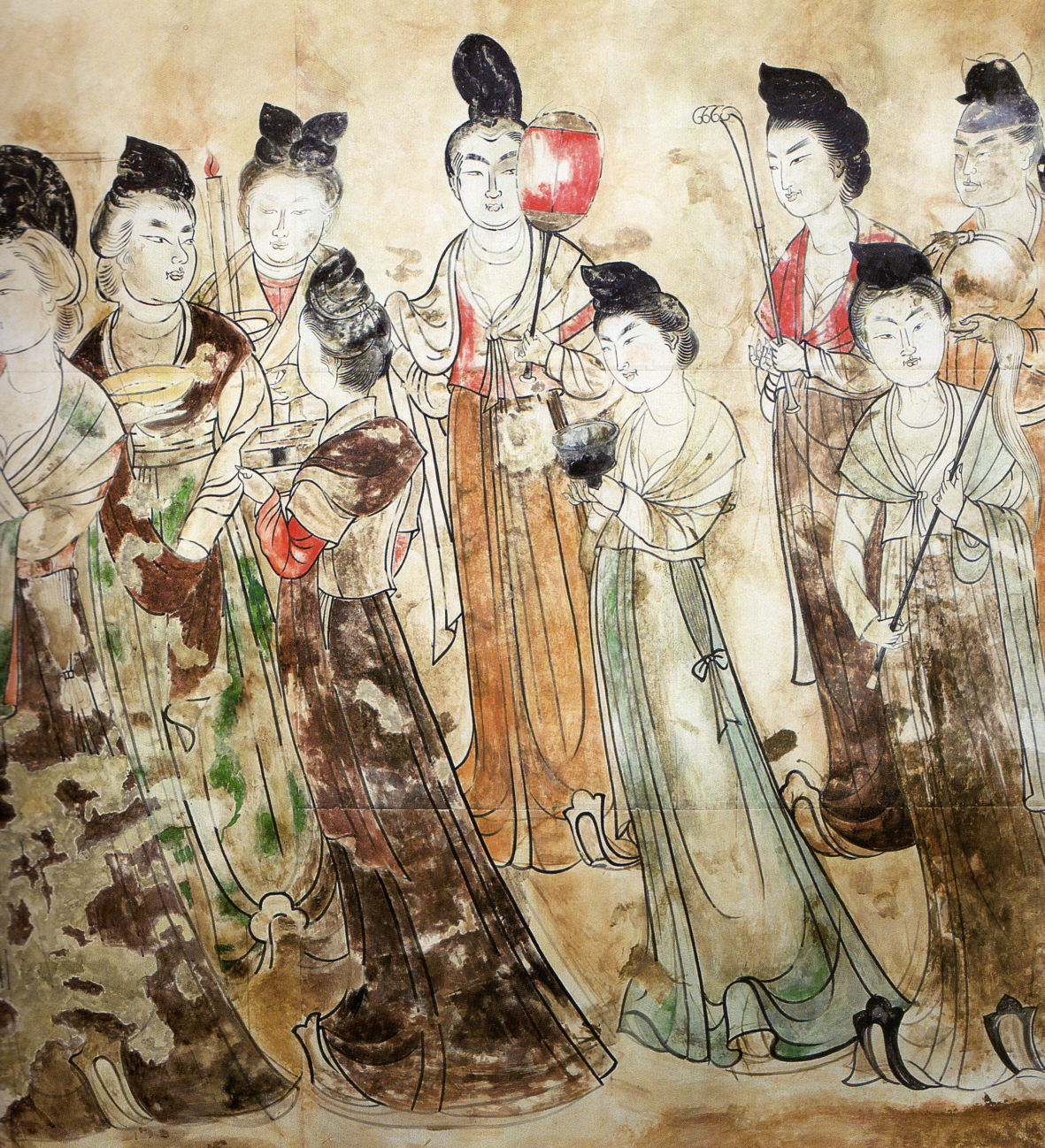
Tang dynasty court ladies from the tomb of Princess Yongtai in the Qianling Mausoleum, near Xi'an in Shaanxi

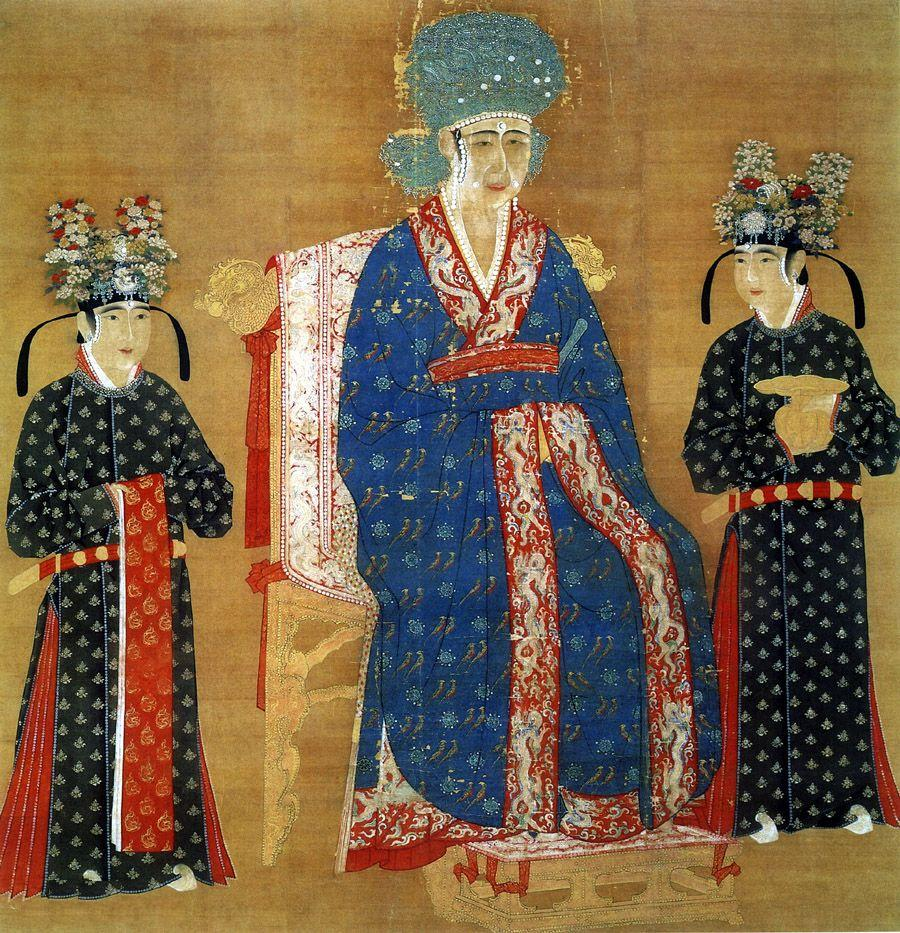
Official Song dynasty portrait painting of Empress Cao, wife of Emperor Renzong of Song

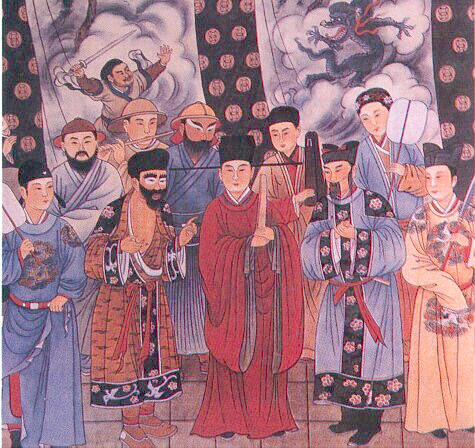
Modern reconstruction of temple mural shows clothes of the Yuan dynasty

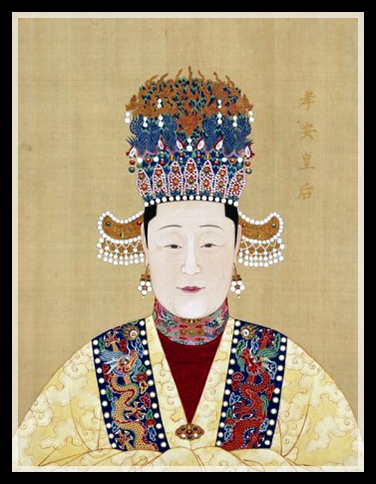
Ming dynasty Empress Xiao'an

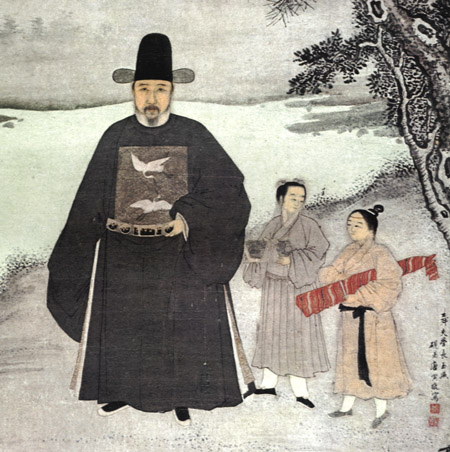
A 15th-century portrait of the Ming official Jiang Shunfu. The decoration of two cranes on his chest are a mandarin square "rank badge" that indicate he was a civil official of the first rank.

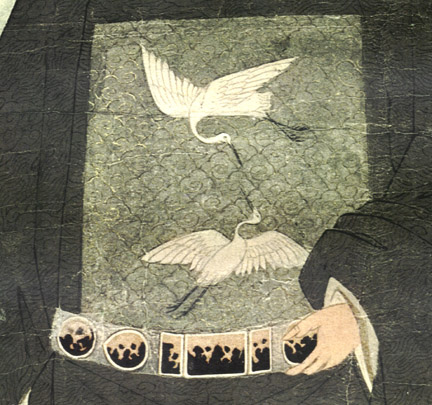
Detail of Jiang Shunfu's rank badge

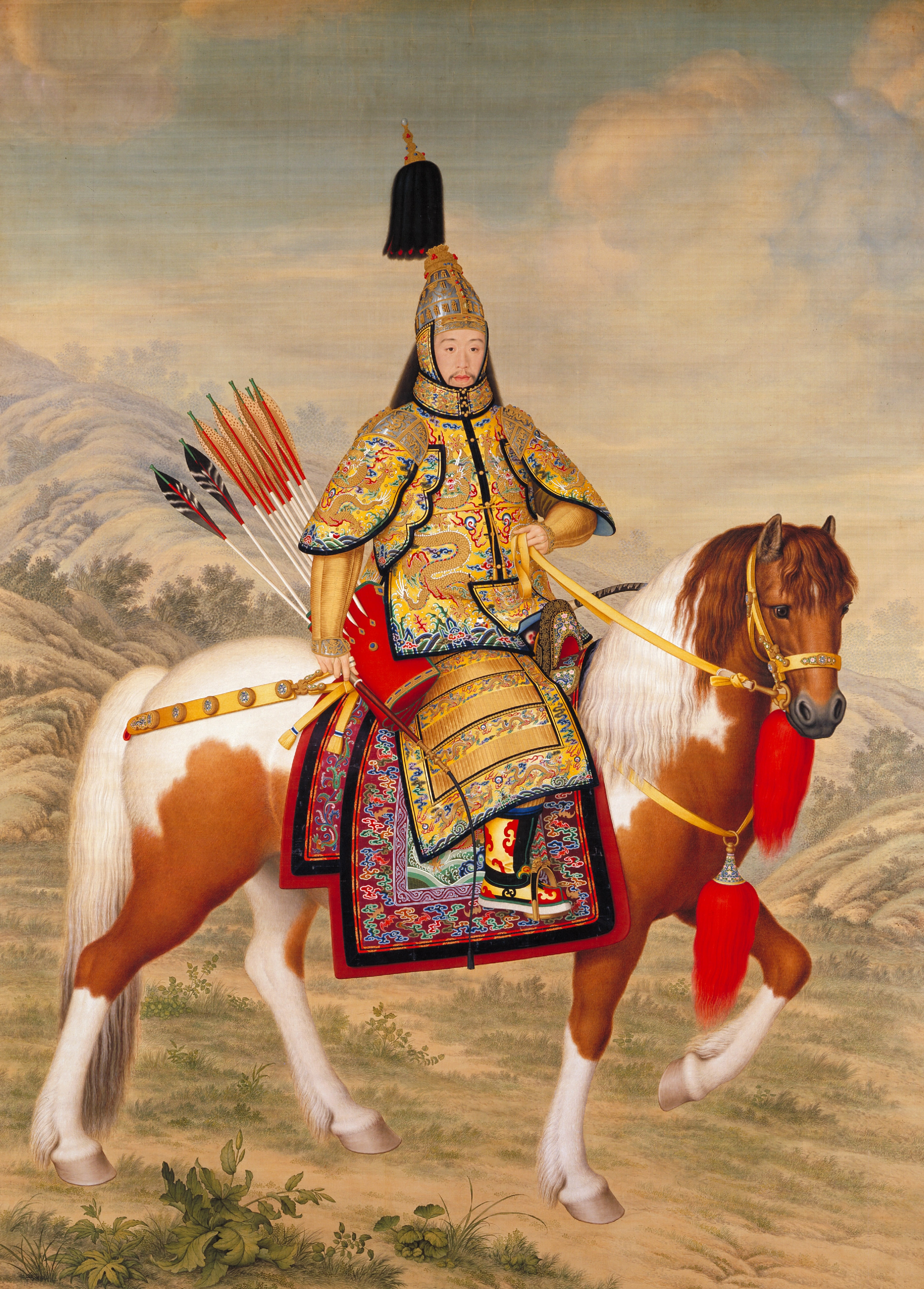
The Qing dynasty Qianlong Emperor in ceremonial armour on horseback

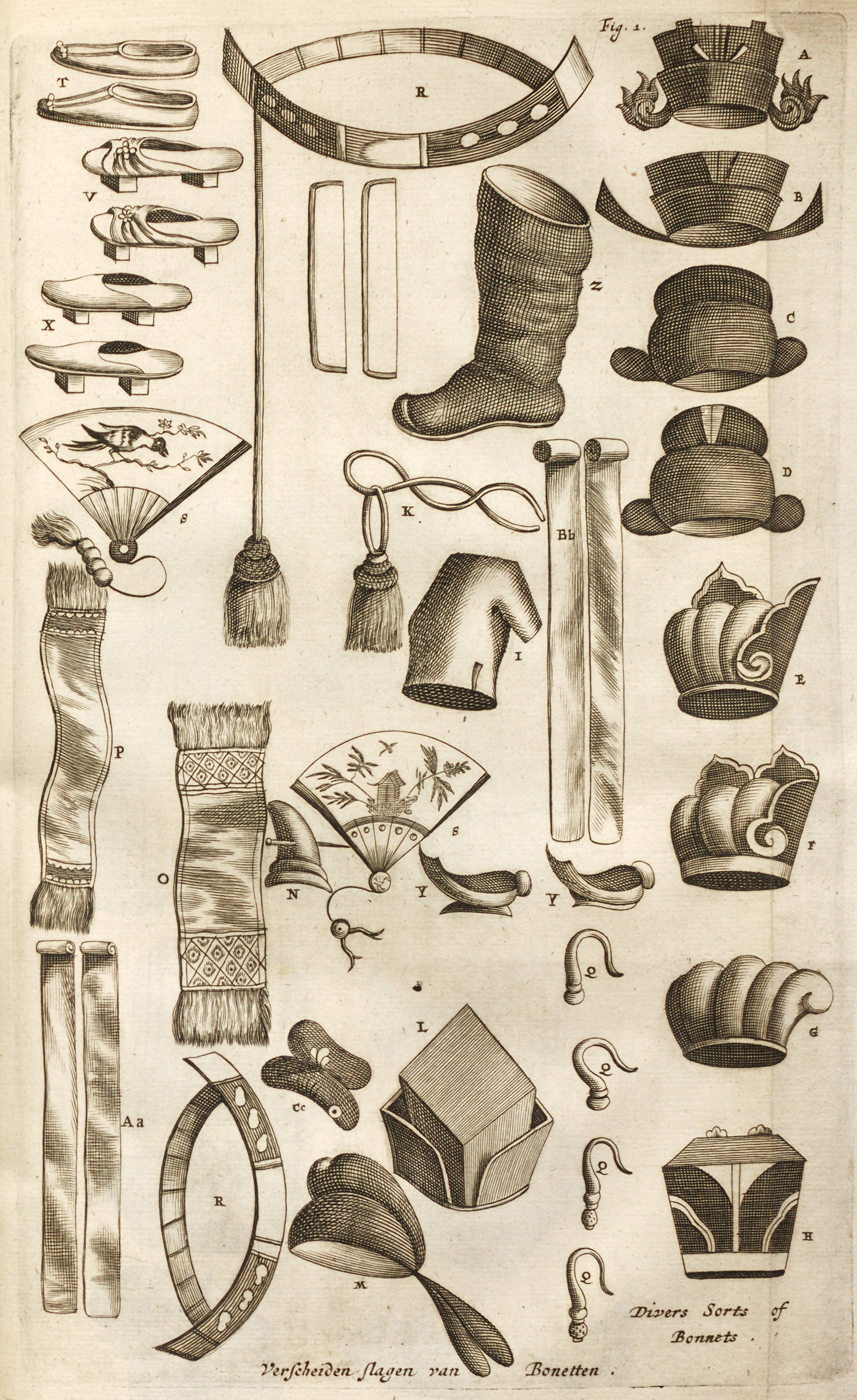
Illustration of Chinese accessories from Olfert Dapper (1670): Gedenkwaerdig bedryf der Nederlandsche Oost-Indische maetschappye

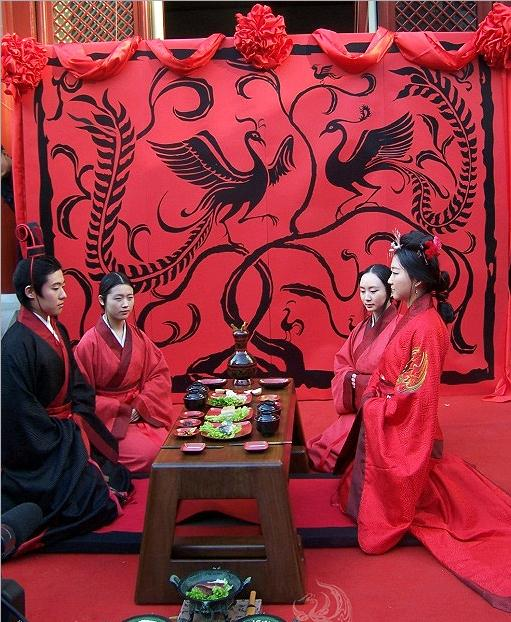
Zhou dynasty-style Chinese wedding dress

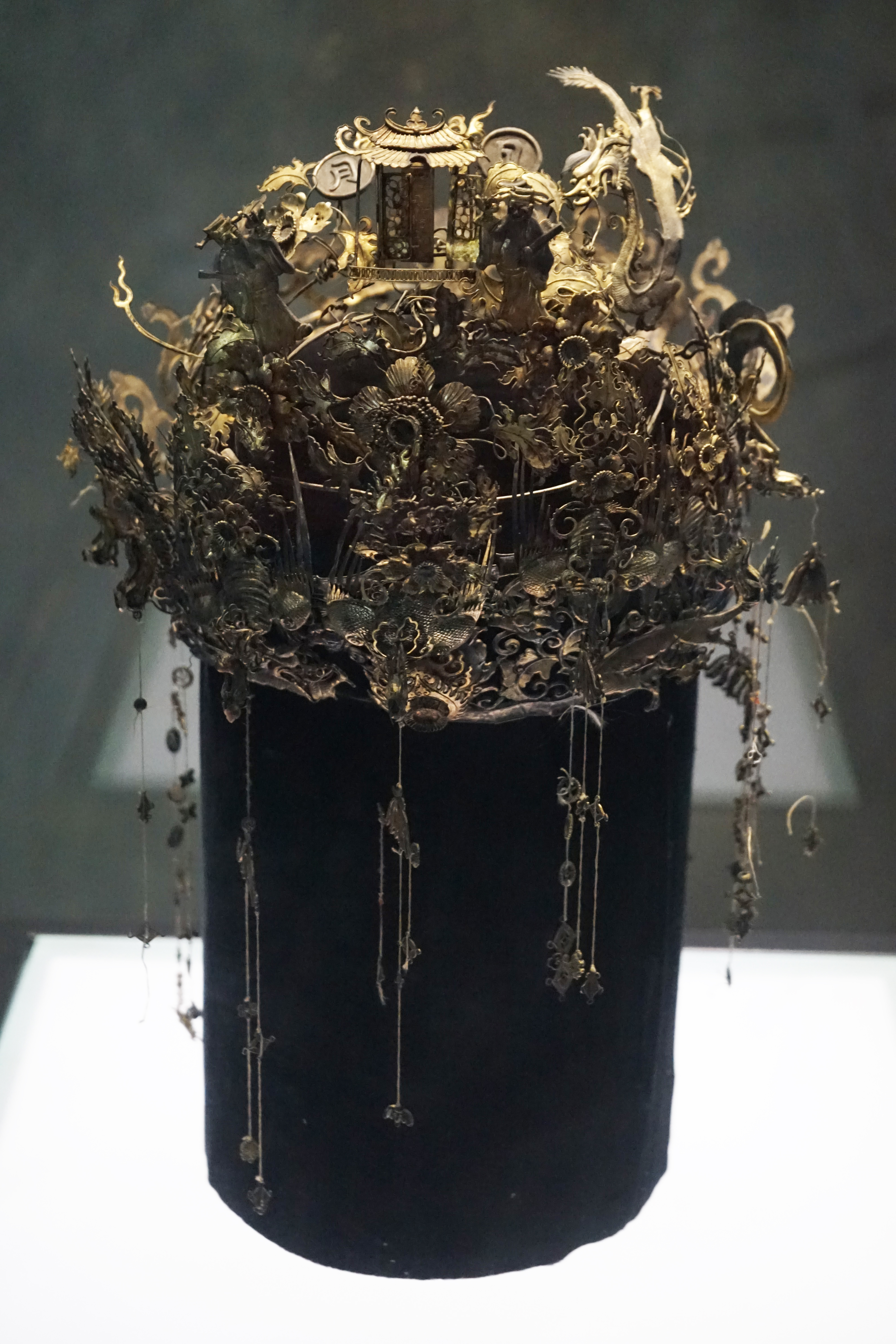
Chinese silver crown

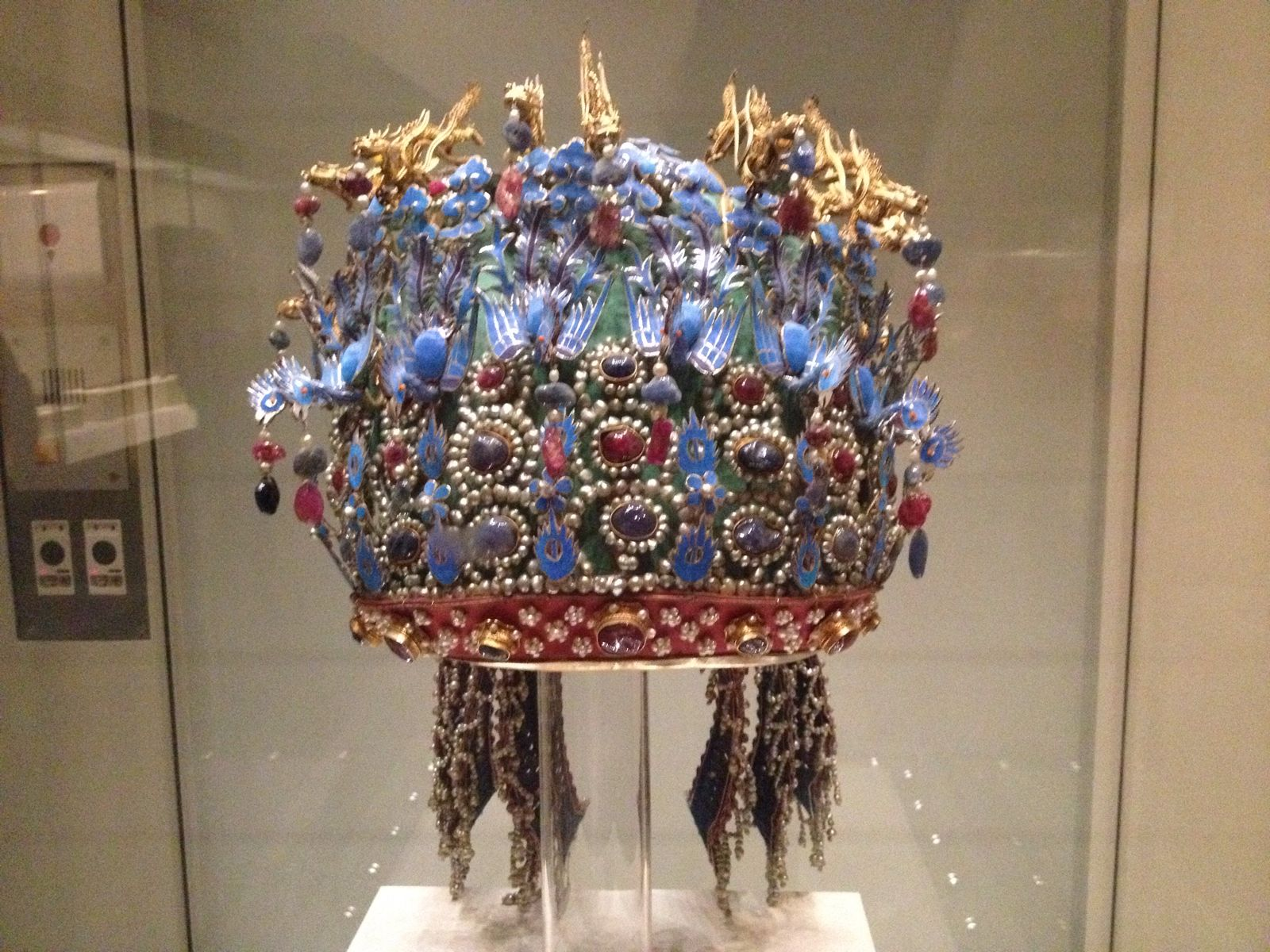
Fengguan of the Ming dynasty empress

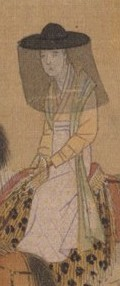
Weimao in the Tang dynasty - Eighteen Songs of a Nomad Flute

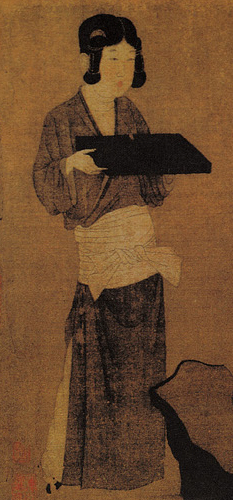
Tang dynasty woman wearing a cross-collared robe

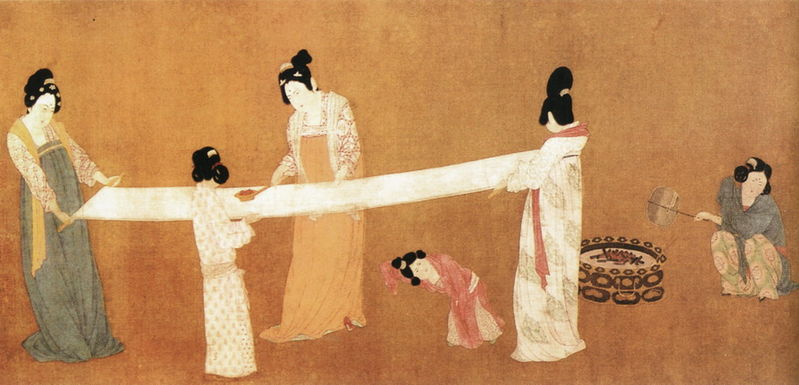
Hanfu in a famous Tang dynasty painting

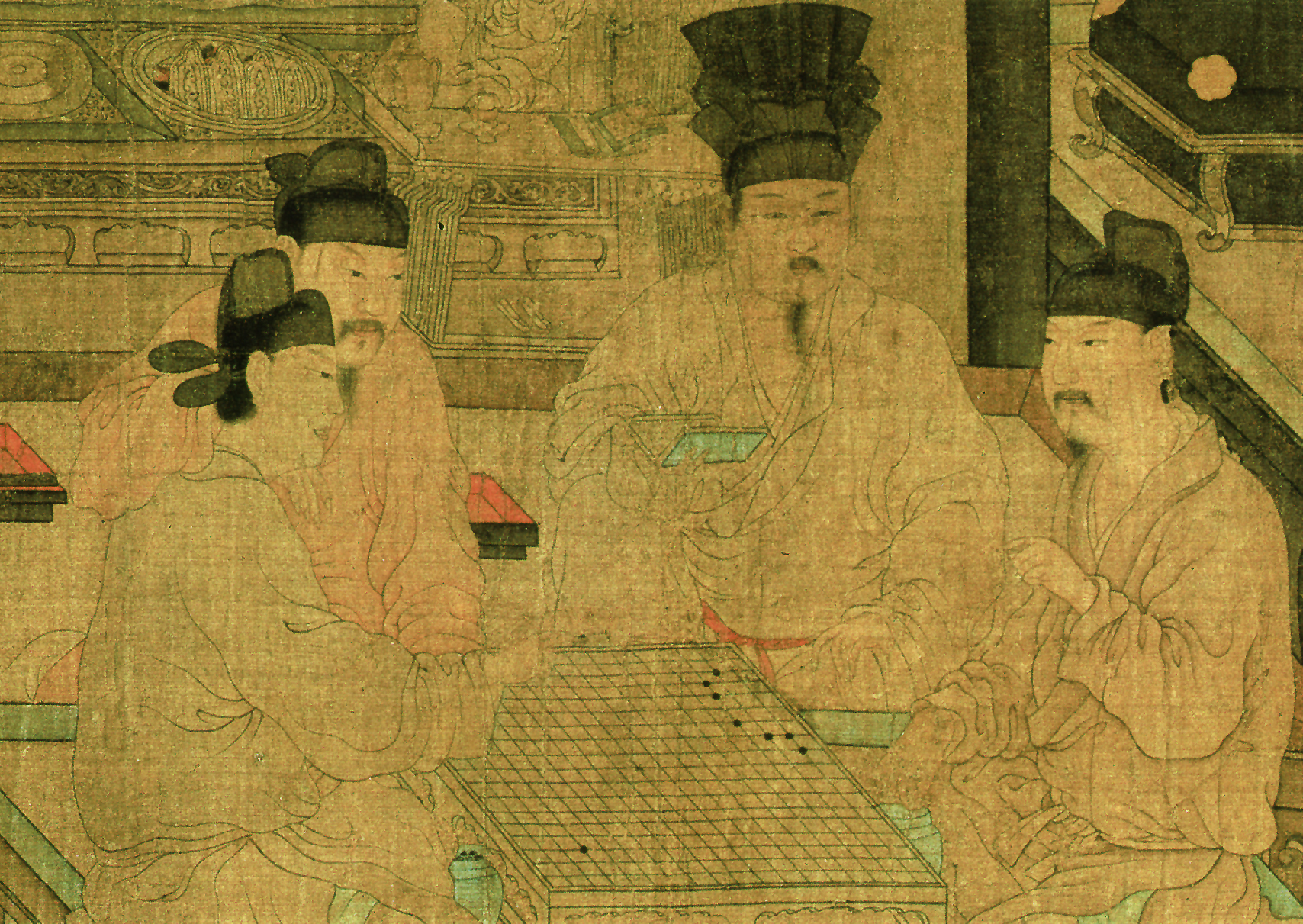
Ancient Chinese who played Go

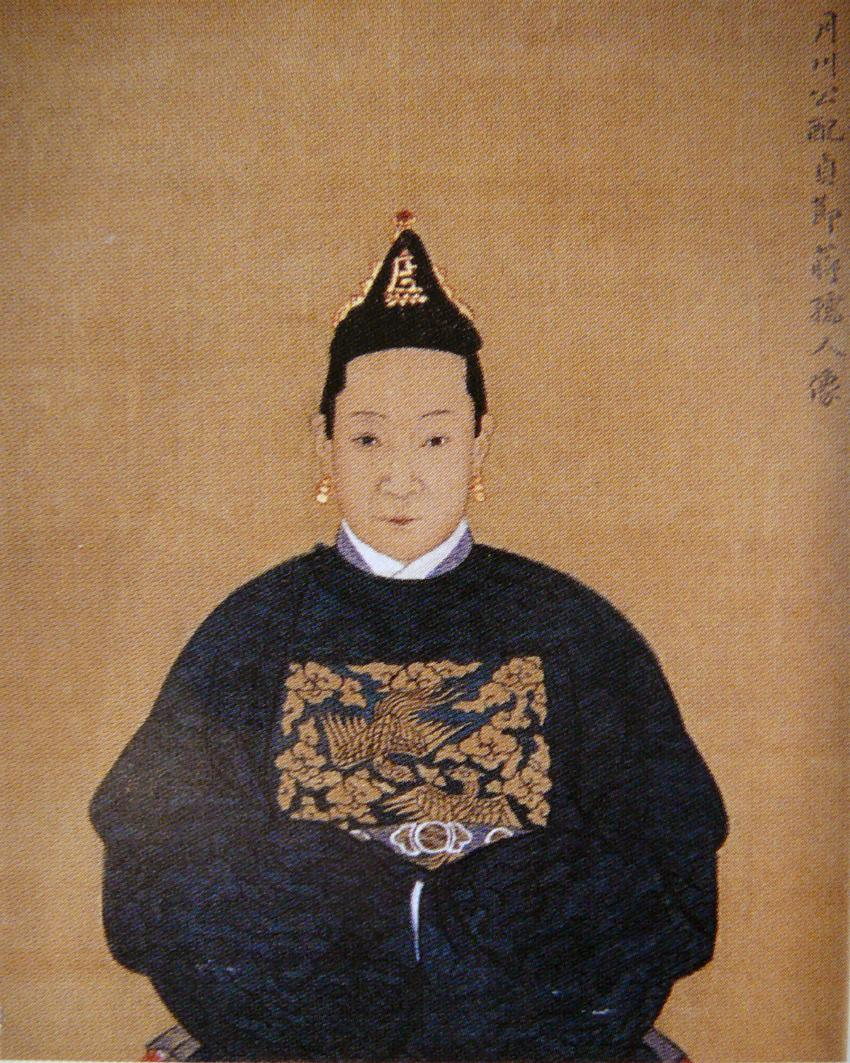
Portrait of a Ming dynasty female official

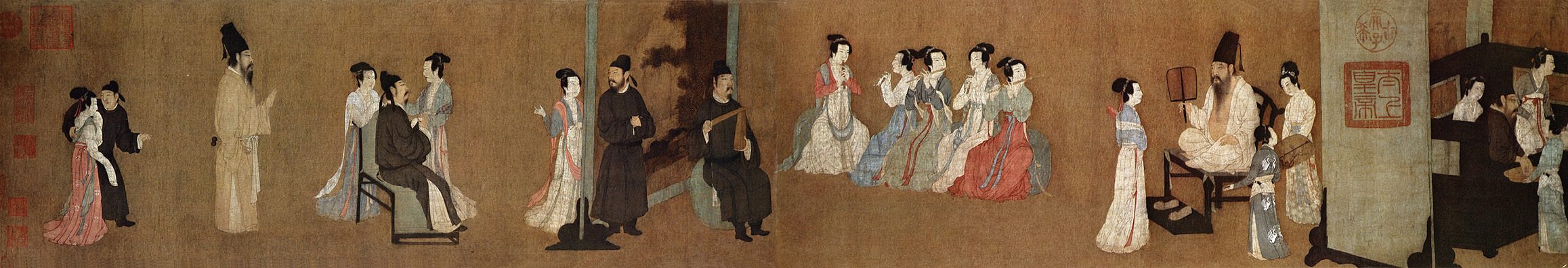
Gu Hongzhong's night revels

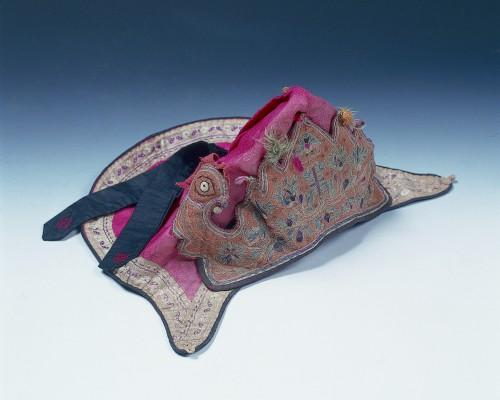
Traditional Chinese hat

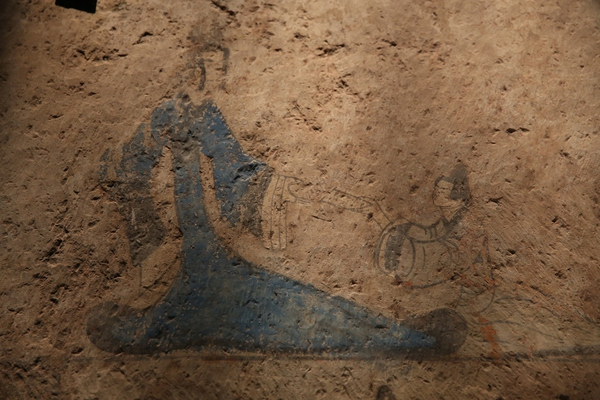
Queen Mother of the West from a wall-painting in a Han dynasty tomb

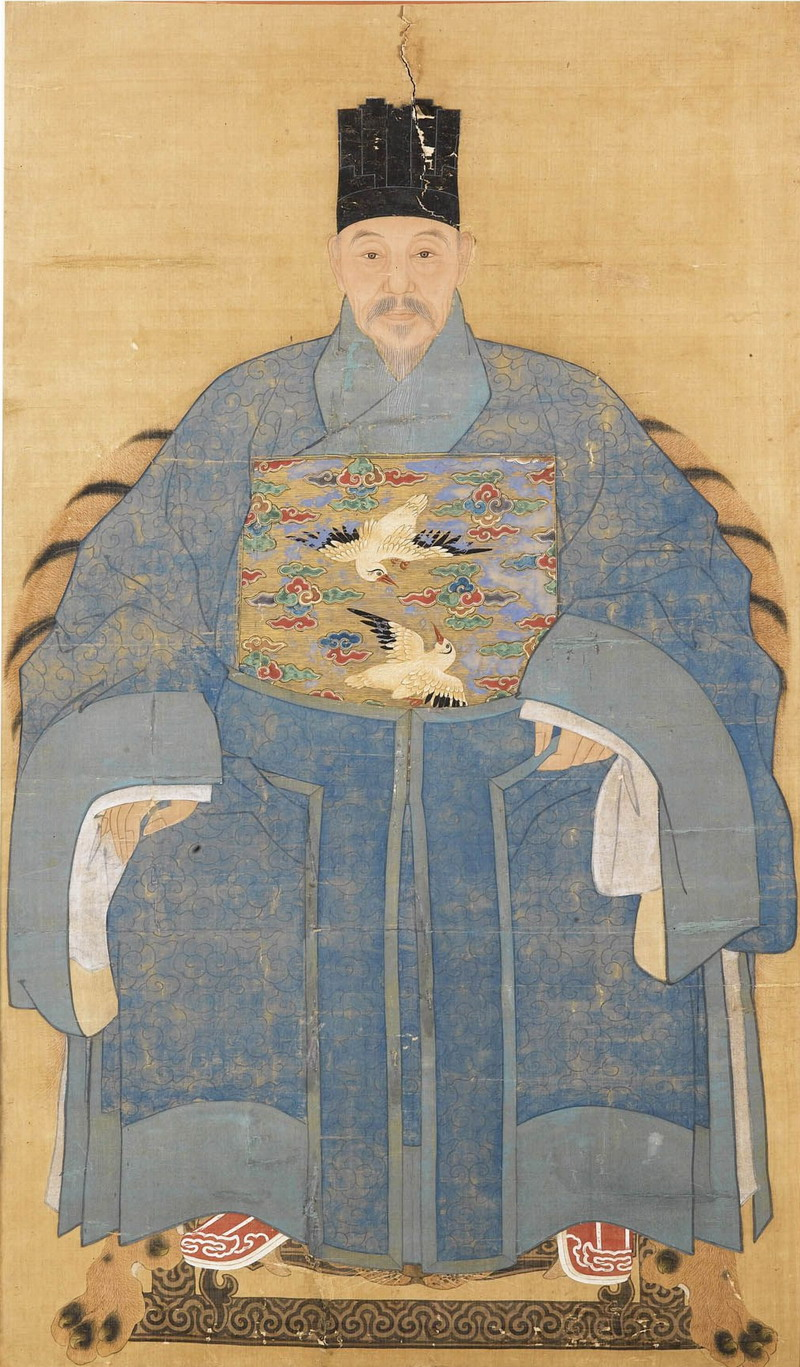
Official Ming dynasty portrait

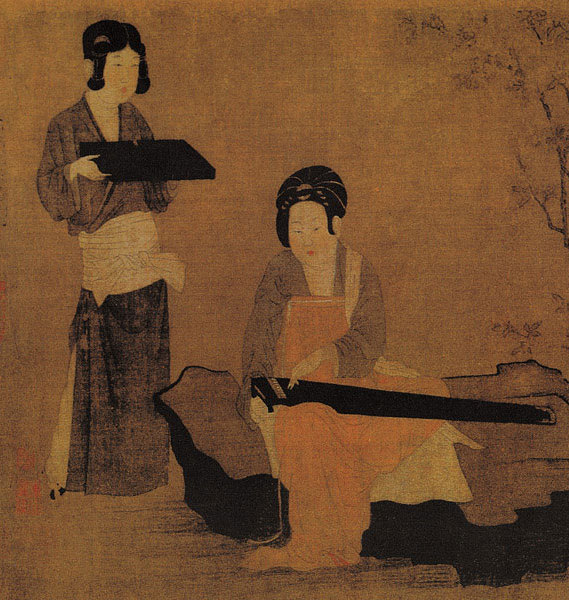
Zhou Fang. Court Ladies Tuning the Lute (28x75) Nelson-Atkins Museum of Art, Kansas City (cropped)

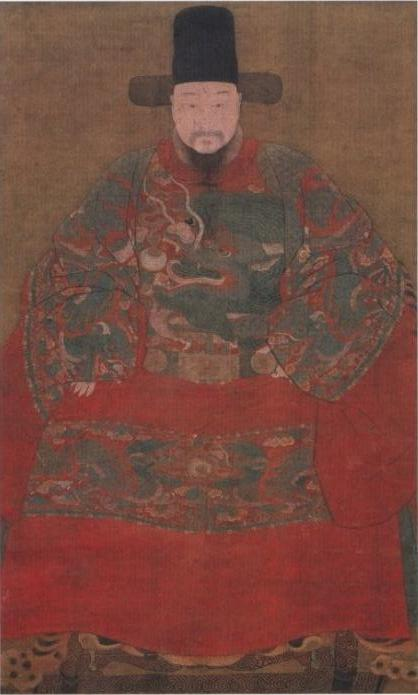
Official Ming dynasty portrait

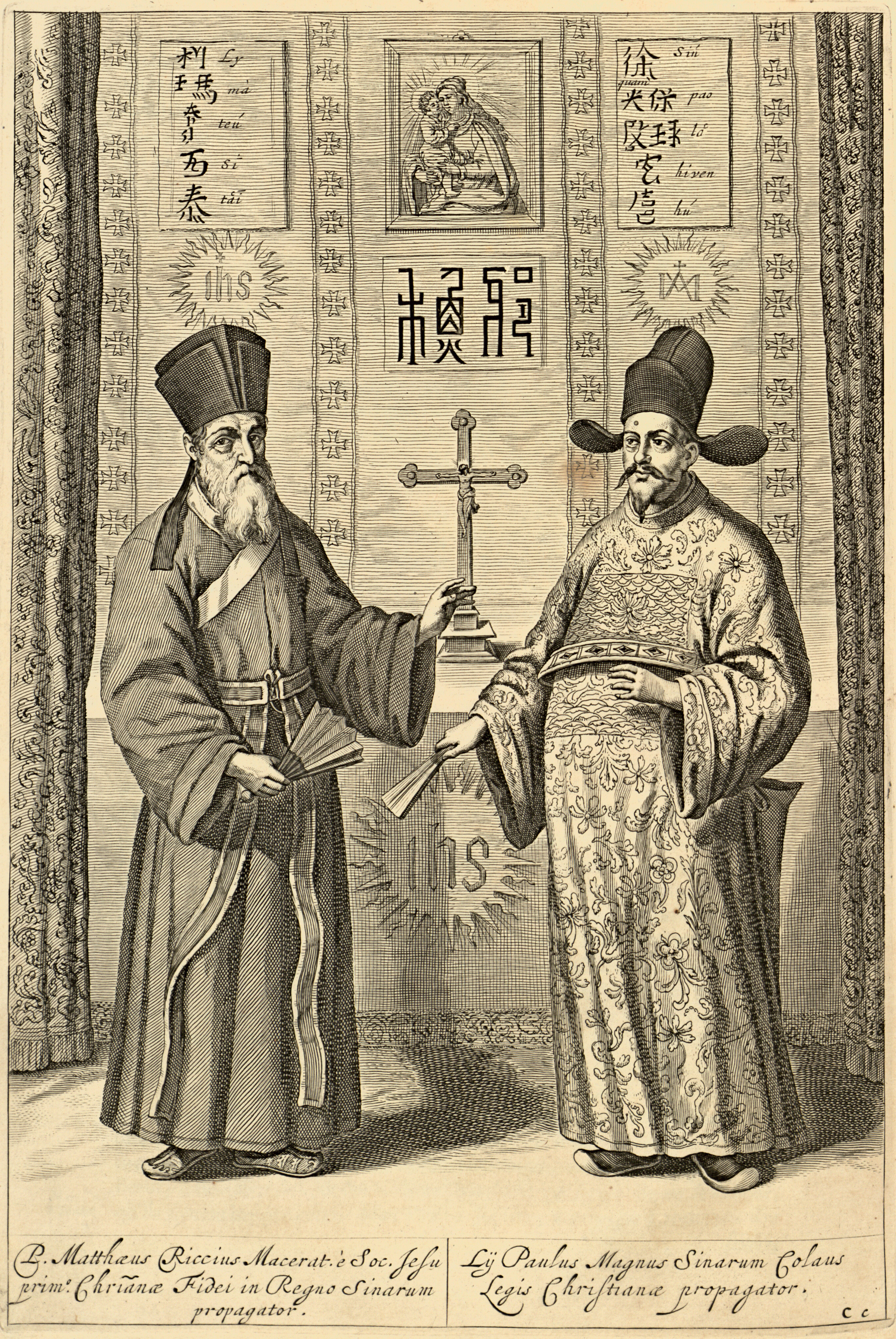
Religion during the Ming dynasty

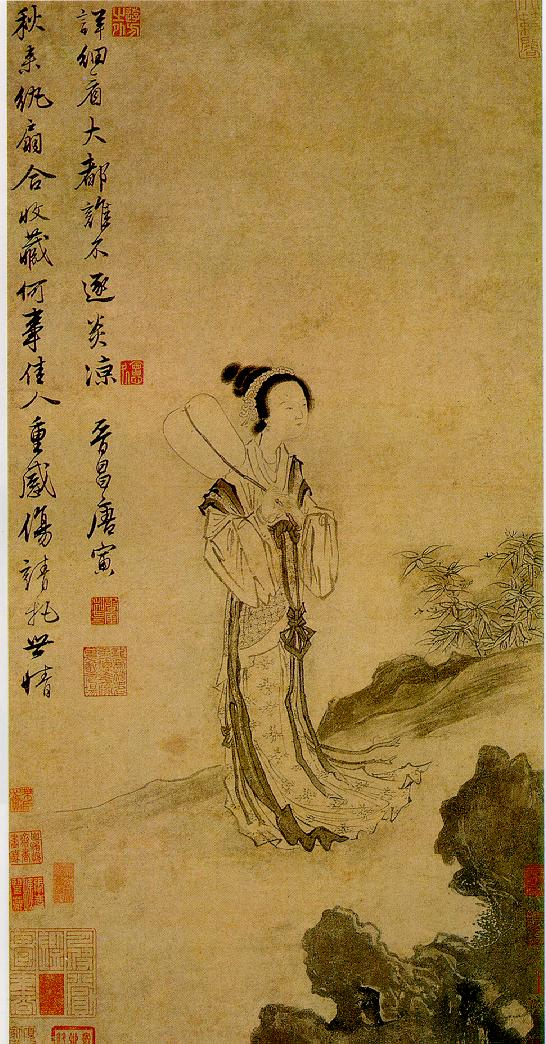
Famous Tang Bohu paintings

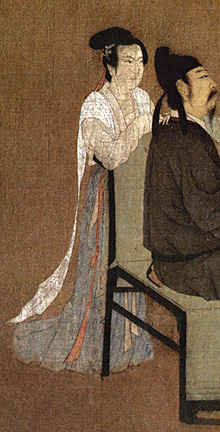
Hanfu during the Song dynasty

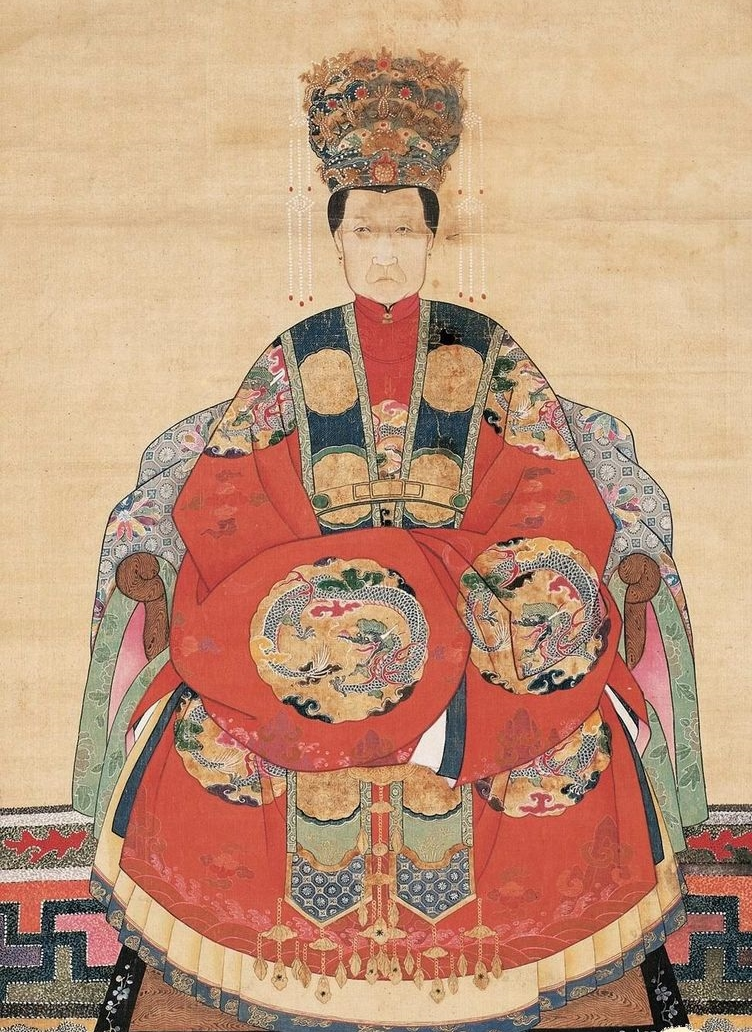
Portrait of a lady of the late Ming dynasty

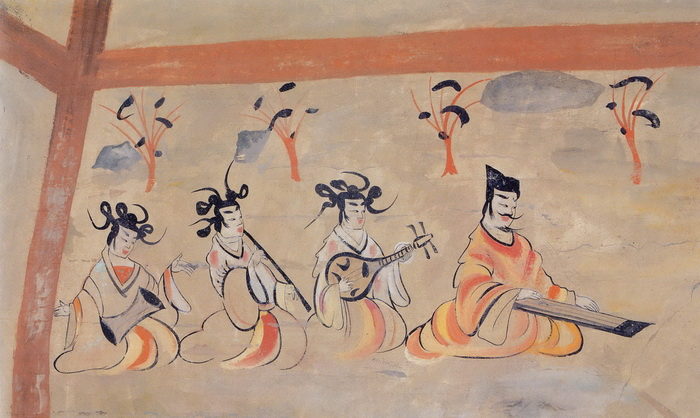
Image of musicians in ancient China

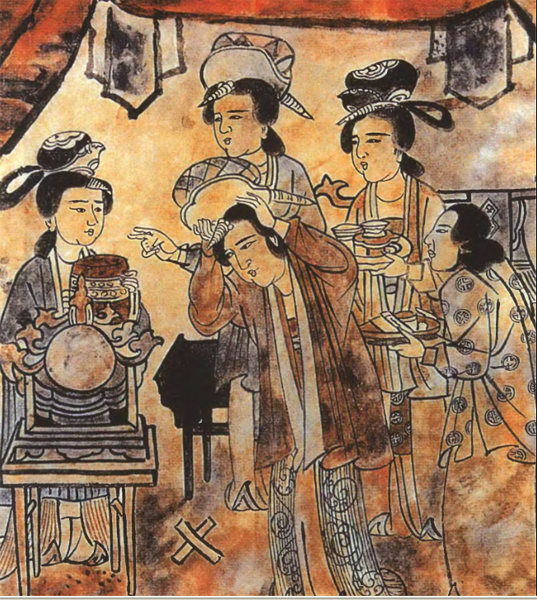
Daily life records of court women during the Song dynasty

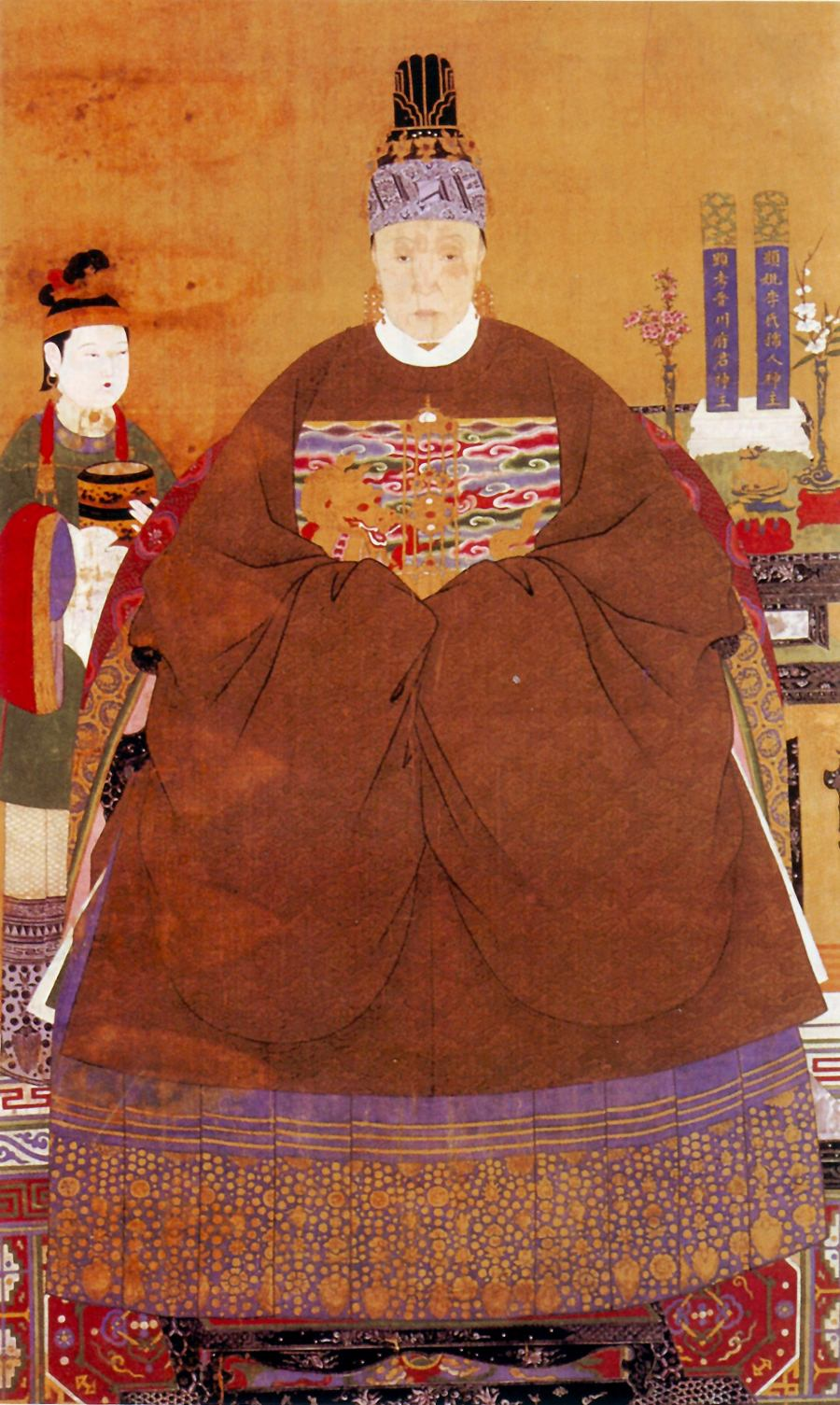
Portrait of a Ming noblewoman

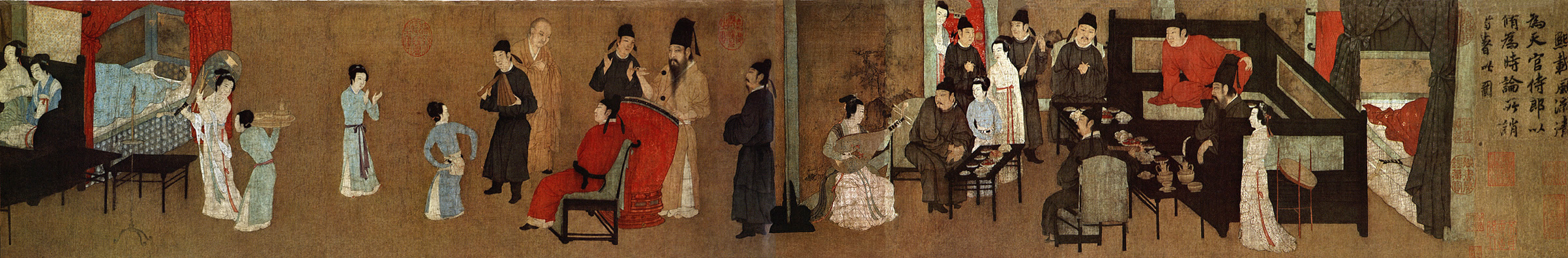
Gu Hongzhong's Night Revels

Portrait of Li Liufang

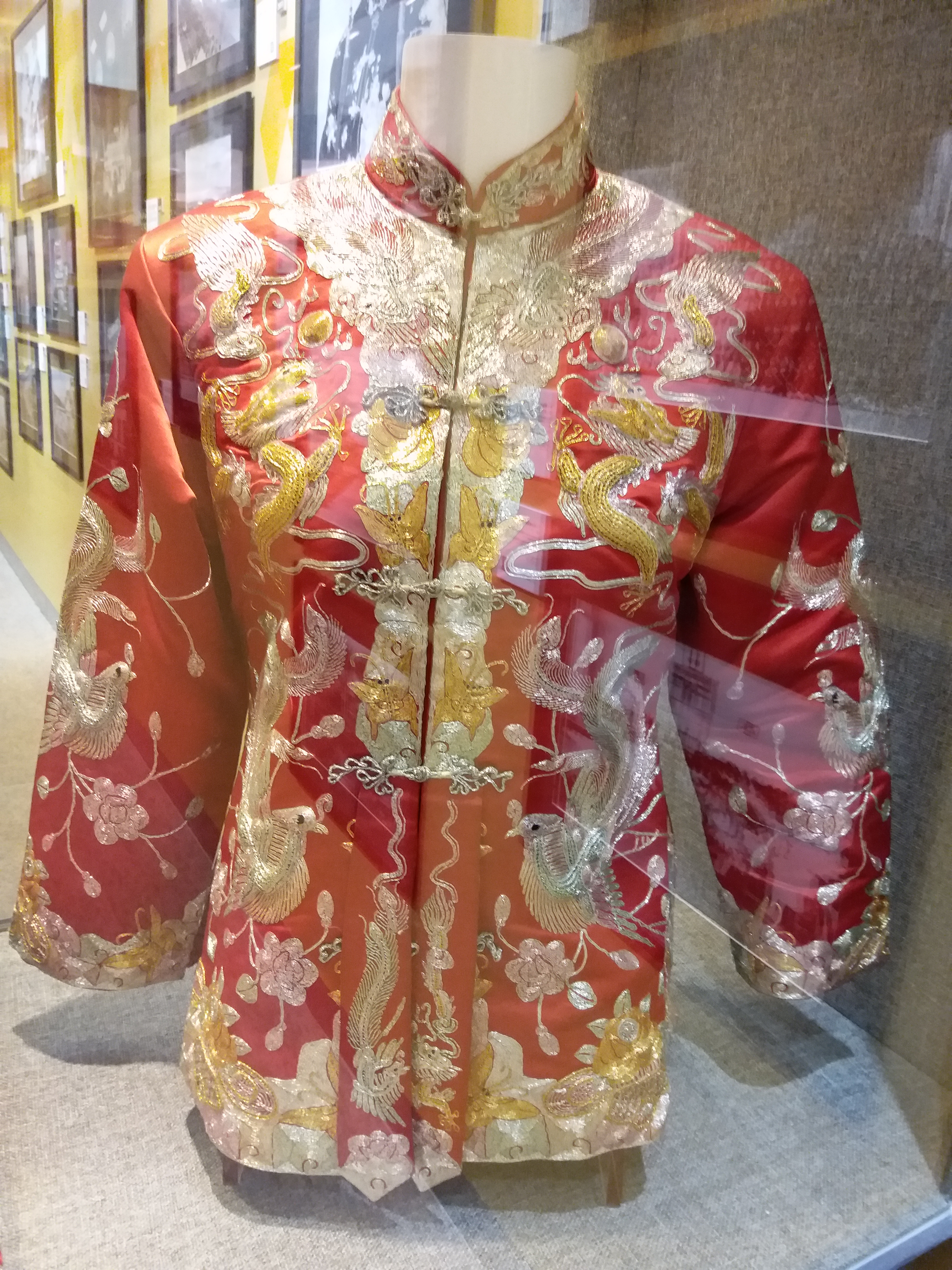
Chinese bridal wedding gown

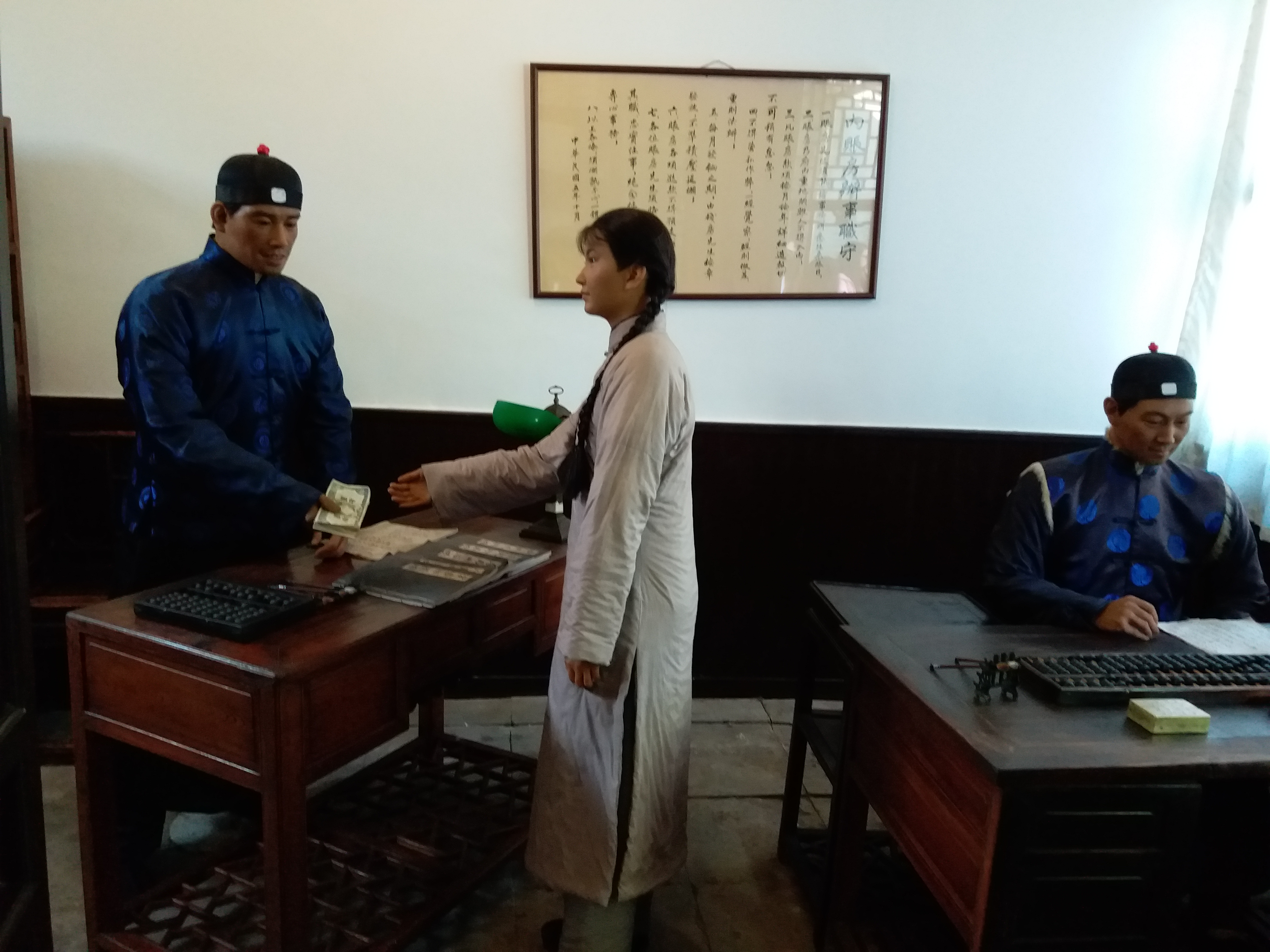
Traditional Chinese clothing

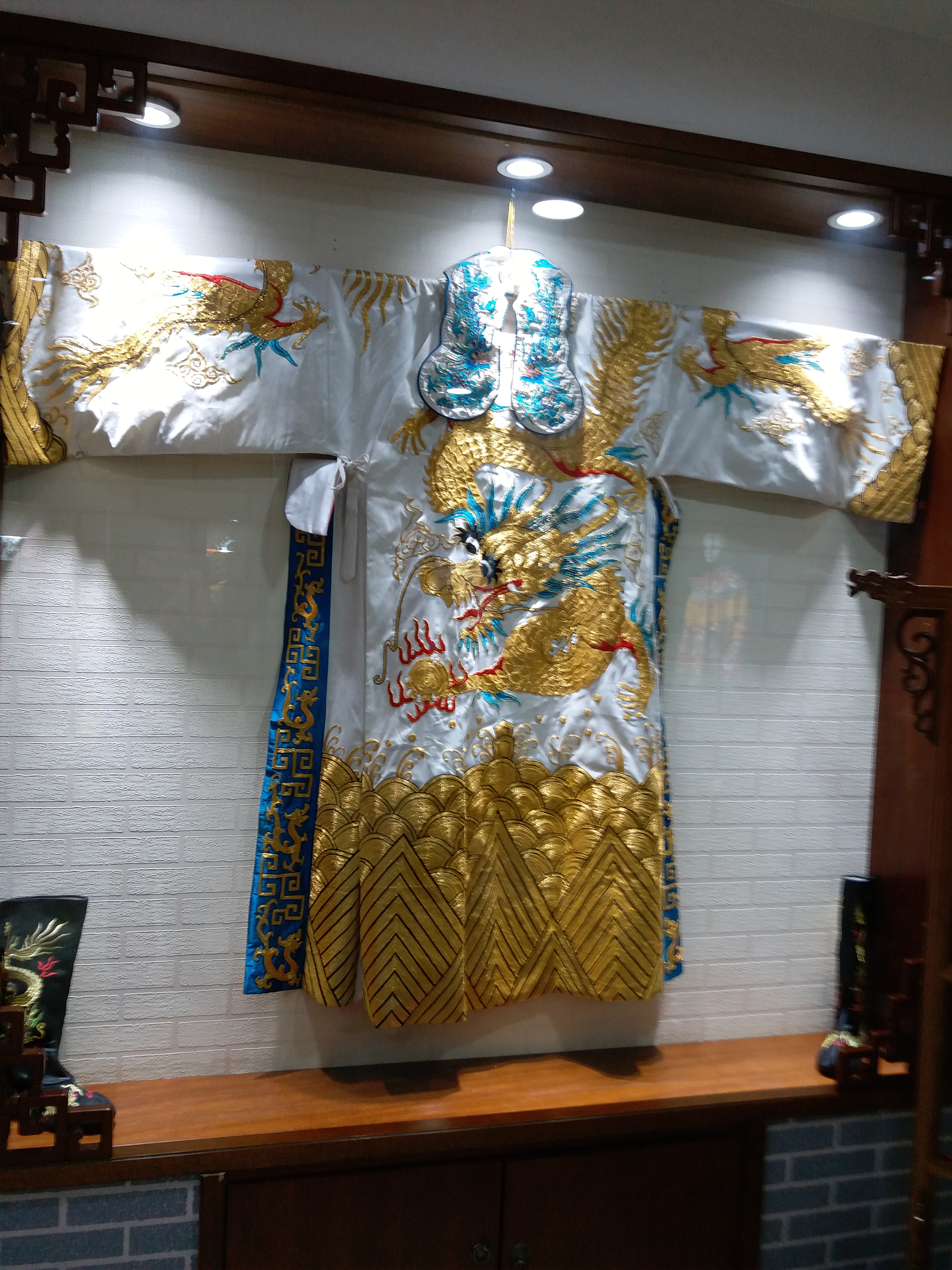

== See also ==
- Chinese patchwork
- Popular fashion in ancient China
- Hanfu
- Cheongsam
- National costume
- Qizhuang
