= Neo-Chinese style =

Chinese art movement and style

Neo-Chinese style (Chinese: 新中式), New Chinese style, Neo-Chinese fashion is a late-20th century and early 21st-century movement in architecture, creative arts, and fashion that combines traditional Chinese elements with modern culture in China.

In architectural design, Chinese cultural elements and neoclassical architecture were combined in the 1950s, while the combination of modern architecture and postmodernism began in the late 1980s. The foreign style fused with Chinese traditional architecture, political ideologies, and regional architecture, creating China’s contemporary architecture and the neo-Chinese architecture style. For interior design, neo-Chinese style combines contemporary furniture and materials with Chinese patterns, shapes, and soft-color palette, in contrast to the complexity of the traditional Chinese interiors.

The characteristics of the new Chinese style of fashion include simplified traditional elements with modern designs. For example, application of Mandarin collar in contemporary apparel design such as shirts and dresses. The neo-Chinese style fashion gained popularity in the 2020s, reflecting the younger Chinese generation's identification and confidence with Chinese culture.

New Chinese style is widely used in a variety of occasions, from casual to formal. This mix-and-match style allows the wearer to display classical elegance and an avant-garde sense of style through modern design elements. Overall, the New Chinese style incorporates modern fashion elements while preserving the essence of traditional culture.

== Gallery ==
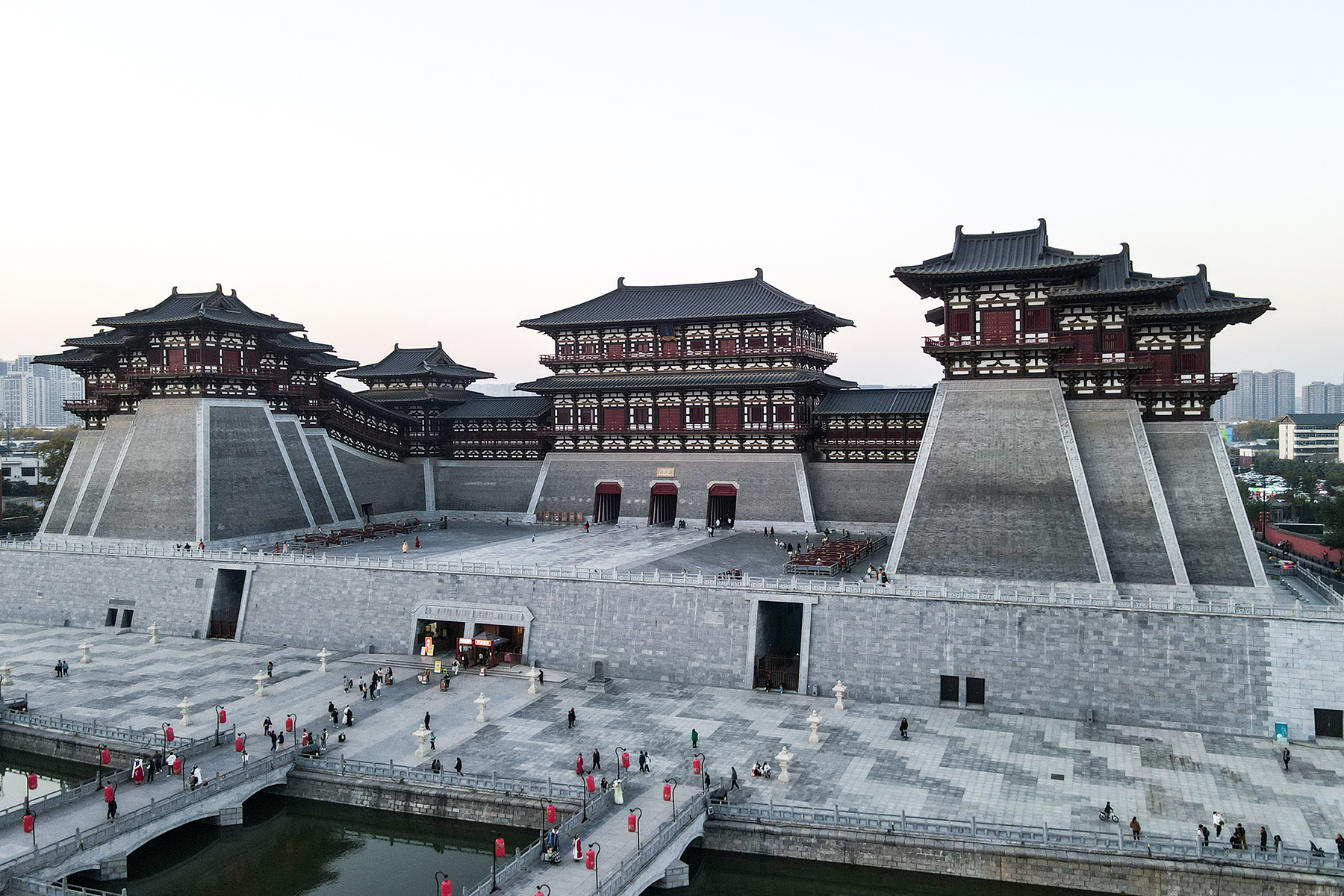
Ying Tian Gate Museum, Luoyang

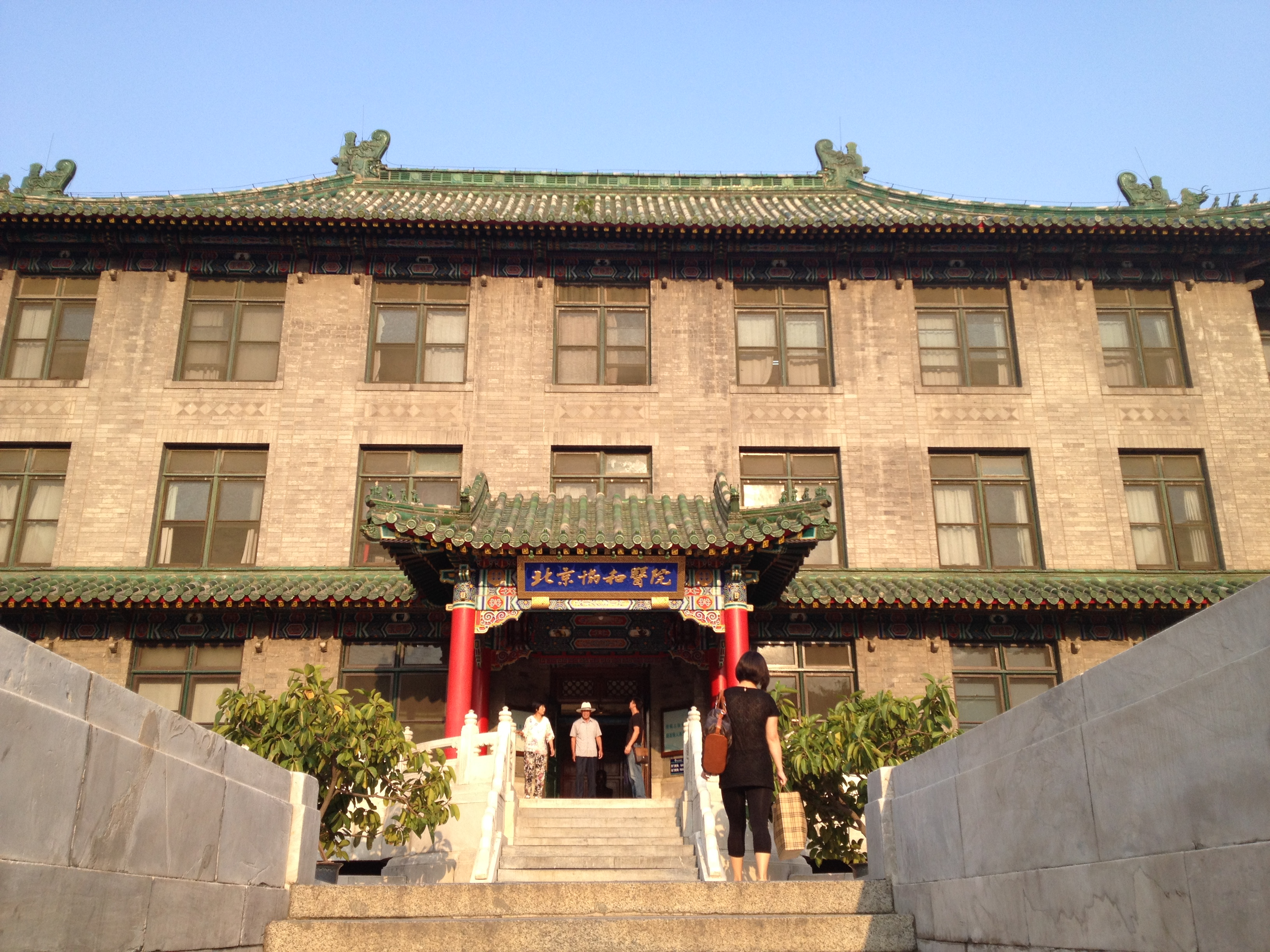
Peking Union Medical College Hospital, neoclassical Chinese architecture

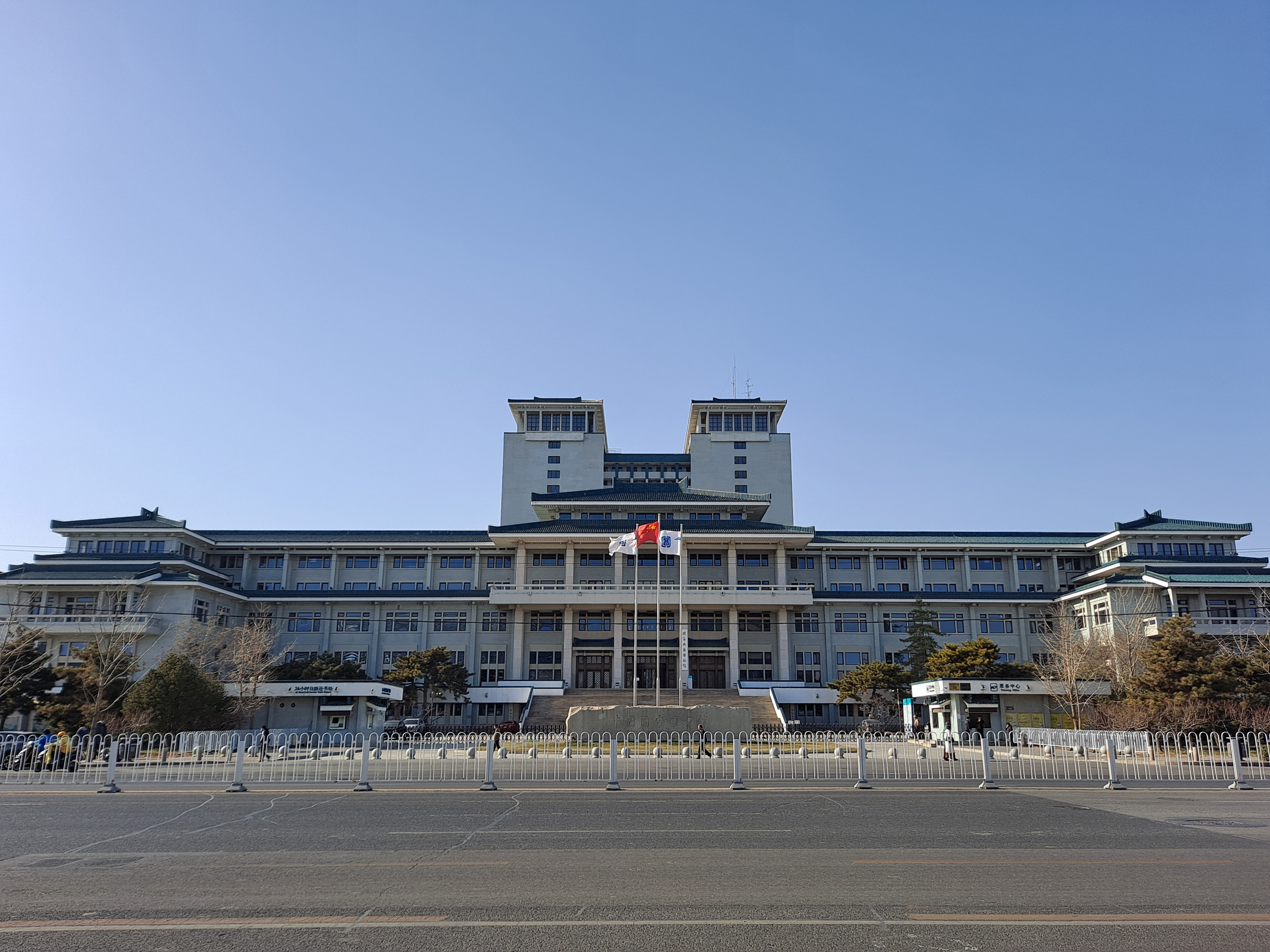
South Wing of the National Library of China, neo-Chinese architecture

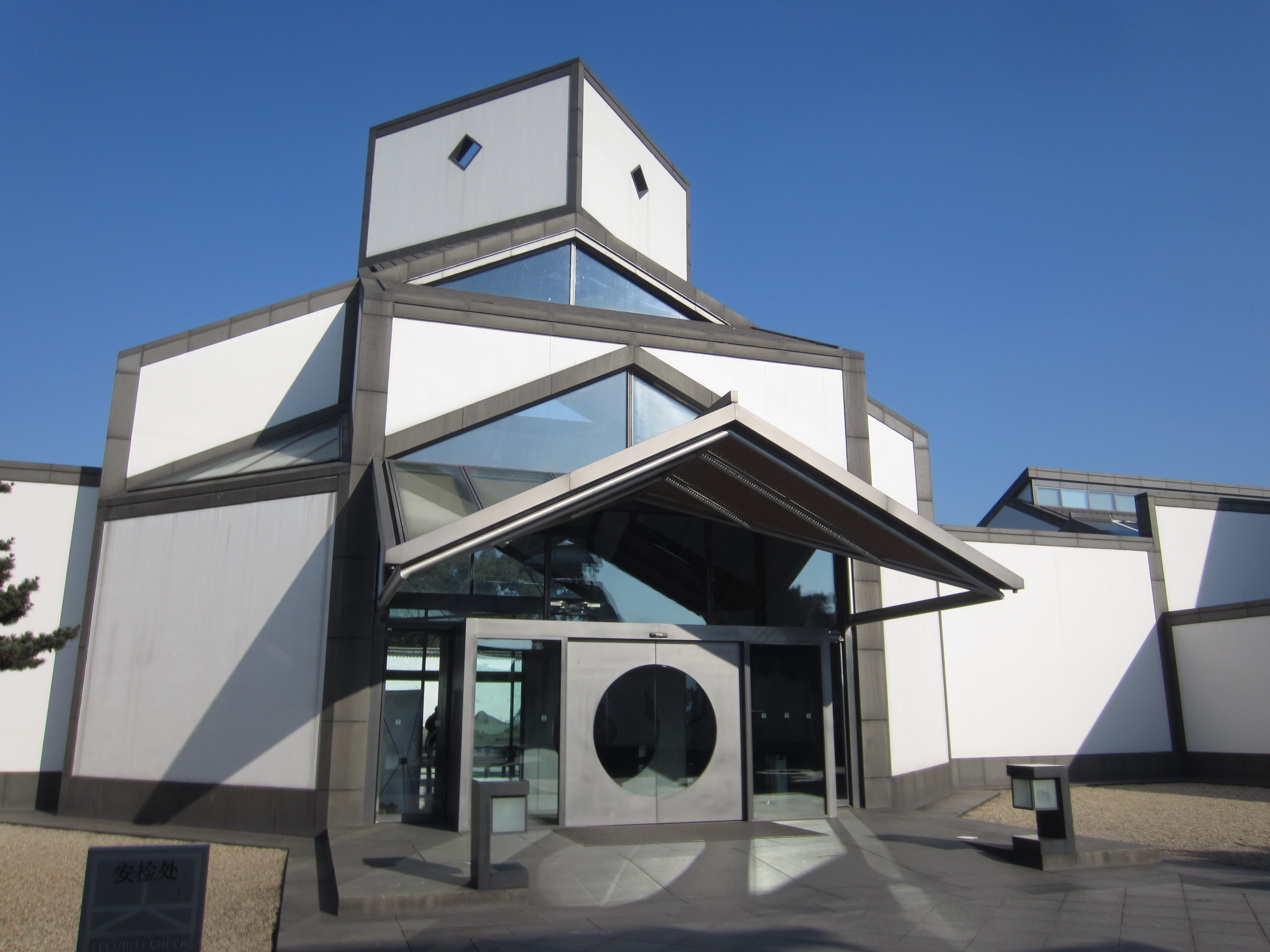
Suzhou Museum, neo-Chinese architecture

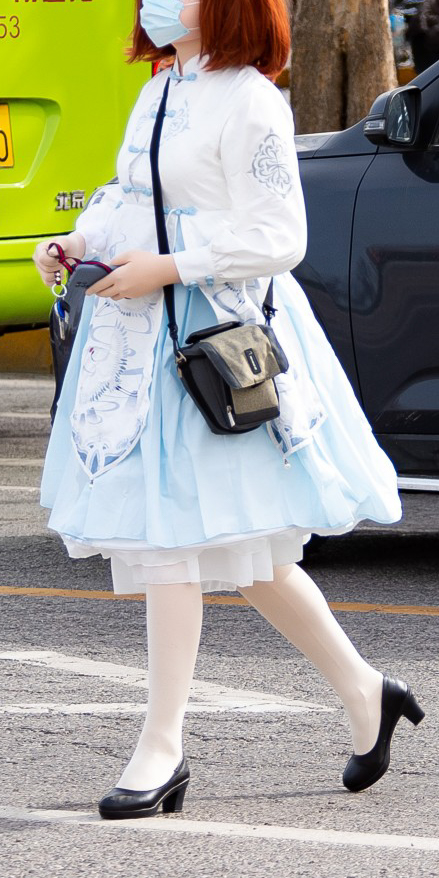
Qipao-inspired lolita dress

== See also ==
- Chinese architecture
- Chinese clothing
