= Jiang Shunfu =

Chinese bureaucrat

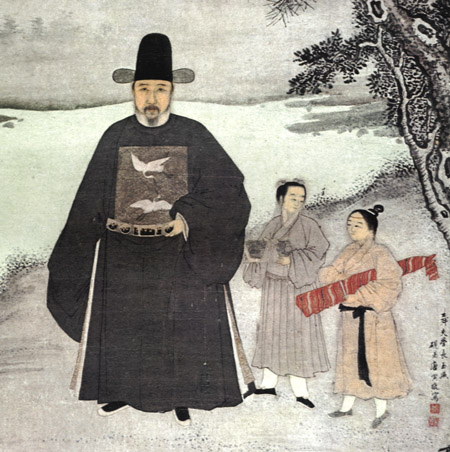
- A 15th-century portrait of Jiang Shunfu
- Chinese: 江舜夫
Transcriptions
Standard Mandarin
- Hanyu Pinyin: Jiāng Shùnfū
- Wade–Giles: Chiang Shun-fu

Jiang Shaozong (Chinese: 江韶宗, 1453–1504), courtesy name Shunfu (Chinese: 舜夫), was a Chinese mandarin of the sixth rank under the Hongzhi Emperor during the Ming dynasty. He is best remembered today for a portrait displaying him in his official robes, one of the most famous such works from the era.

== See also ==
- Chinese painting
