= Popular fashion in ancient China =

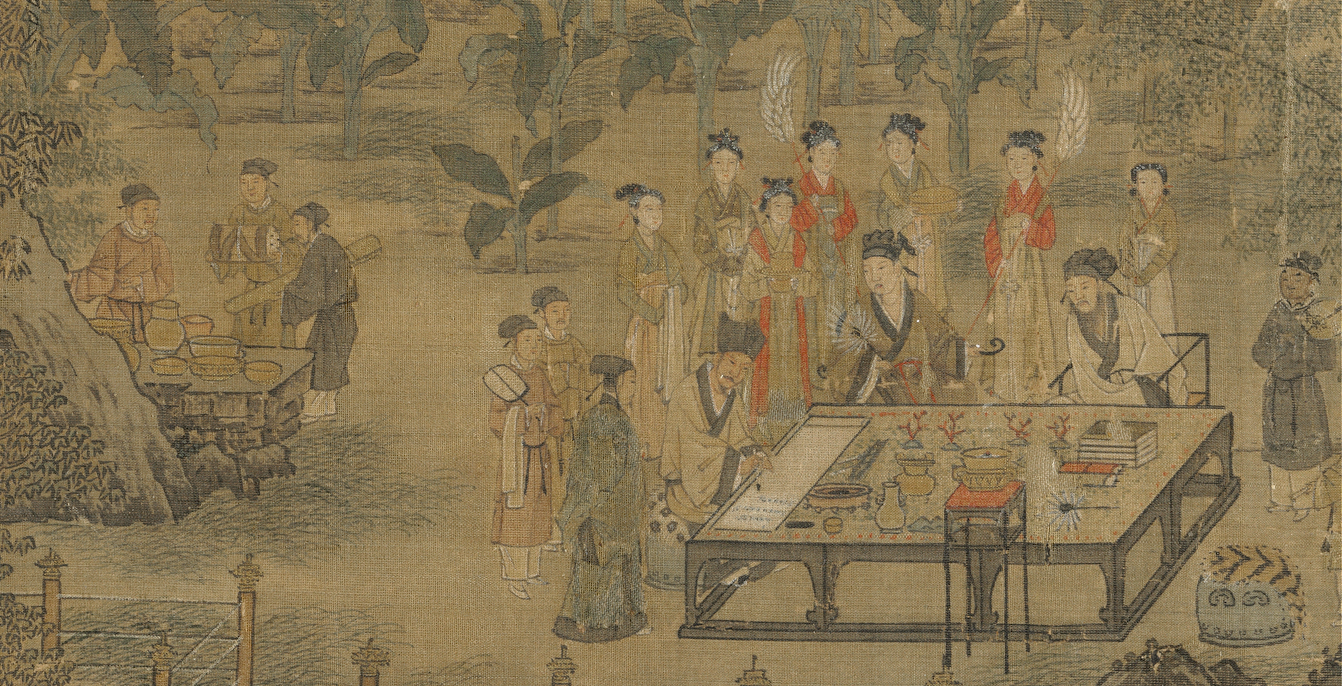
Example of Song dynasty fashion for men and women.

Popular fashion in ancient China was defined by a number of notable aesthetic traditions. The Tang dynasty (CE 618–907) and Song dynasty (CE 960–1279) are the primary periods in which ancient China refers. There are four remarkable aesthetic categories of these two dynasties, including clothing, famous porcelain, favoured flowers, and dominant literary form.

== Clothing ==
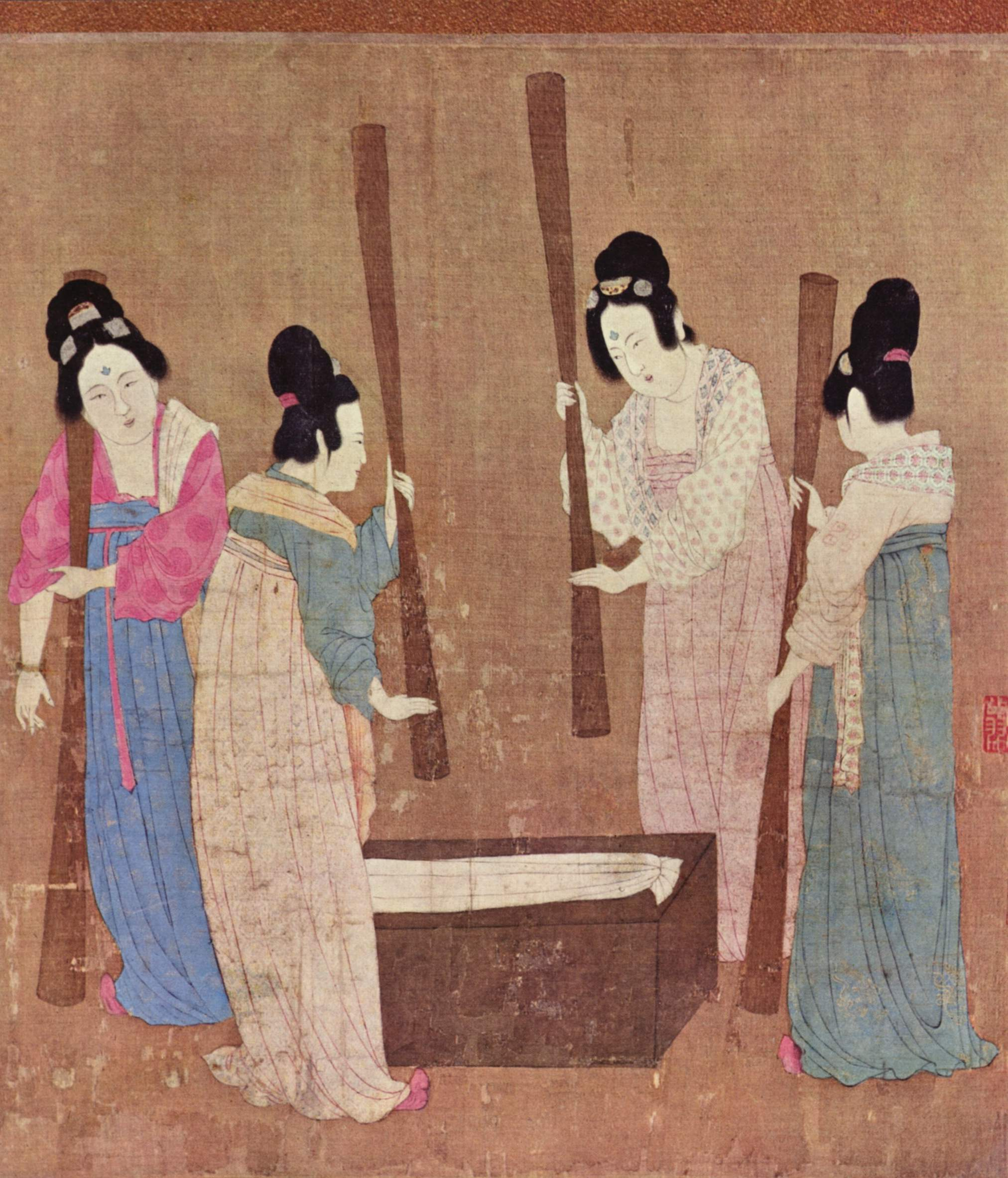
An example of Ruqun painted by Zhang Xuan (713–755) in Tang

The most eye-catching clothing in Tang dynasty is women's clothing, in which the traditional "Ruqun" (Ru Dress 襦裙) formed a unique fashion in the Tang dynasty and Tang people have their distinctive aesthetics. One significant feature of this clothing is that the original collar was transformed into a low collar in the Tang dynasty. This style of collar, which is so low that nearly makes women's breast half-naked, is unprecedented in all dynasties in ancient China. In addition, the waist skirt was raised extremely high to even the underarms (a picture provided on the right for reference) in order to show a chubby body shape. In addition to the style, the colors are rich such as deep red, apricot yellow, deep purple, moon green, grass green, and turmeric and so on. This is because people in Tang dynasty admire the plump body figure and are pursuit of personal preference and the resplendent beauty boldly. Moreover, such aesthetics benefits from the extreme open thoughts and cultural environment that greatly reduces the restrictions on women. Therefore, women possess more freedom to make the clothing choice, by which they can display individuality, for example, through showing off body figure or dressing in favourite colours.

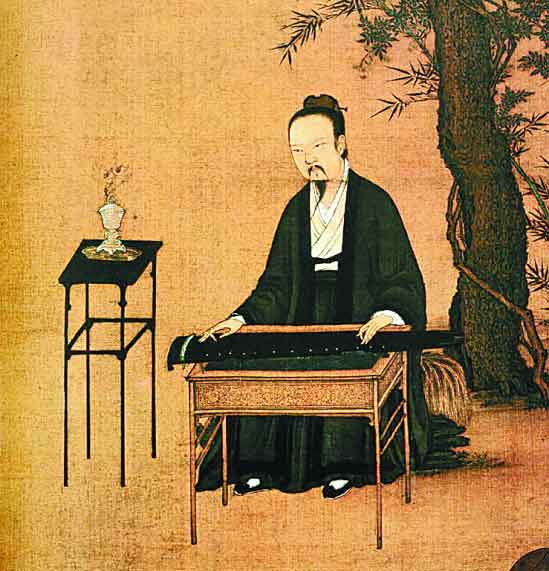
Hechang in Song dynasty. Painted by Emperor Huizong of Song (1082–1135)

On the other hand, the most common clothing for both man and women and represents their aesthetics in Song dynasty is beizi (背子). The most prominent feature is the straight collars that parallel to each other with side slits. The sleeves can be wide or narrow, and the length of the clothes can reach to the knees or ankles or above knees. The colours are usually pure and less bright, which represents Song people's different aesthetics that like simplicity, calmness and sense comparing to the unrestrained clothing style in Tang dynasty.

However, in Song dynasty, even though the aesthetics is influenced by Neo-Confucianism to some degree that reflected in simplicity of clothing choices, the porcelain style still develops diversely. This aesthetics change is due to the cultural transformation in the Song dynasty. The spirit of Chinese classical aesthetics developed to extreme, in which the style of simple and elegant is pursued instead of the deliberate unique. This style of the clothing wrapping people's body into a cylinder through its straight outline, which demonstrates a sense of restraint and abstinence tendency. This tendency emerged from the essential Neo-confucianism that emphasizes strict order and absolute superiority-inferiority relationship and subordination between the monarch and subjects, father and son, and husband and wife.

== Popular porcelain ==
As a great country of porcelain and ceramics, China has been making prominent and extraordinary achievements in this field. Whereas there is a huge system of porcelain industry in both Tang and Song dynasties, the representative achievements are the Tang Sancai (triple-colour ceramics) and the greatly developed porcelain styles respectively. Tang is the most prosperous dynasty in history of China, in which one distinctive style ceramics Sancai is outstanding. Sancai is not only remarkable for its shape, decoration and glaze firing, but also for its artistic style—colourful and lively. There are many colours such as yellow, auburn, green, white and navy used in the Sancai making, which reflects an open and flourishing culture in Tang and the pursuit of resplendence in aesthetics. Such an aesthetic are also revealed by the vivid shape of Sancai, which is shaped with regards of many aspects in reality, for instance, buildings, livestock, human figure, and daily items (plates, lights, pillows, bottles. etc.). For example, the figures of horse are lively and natural for the smooth curves of the muscle of its legs and delicate saddle.

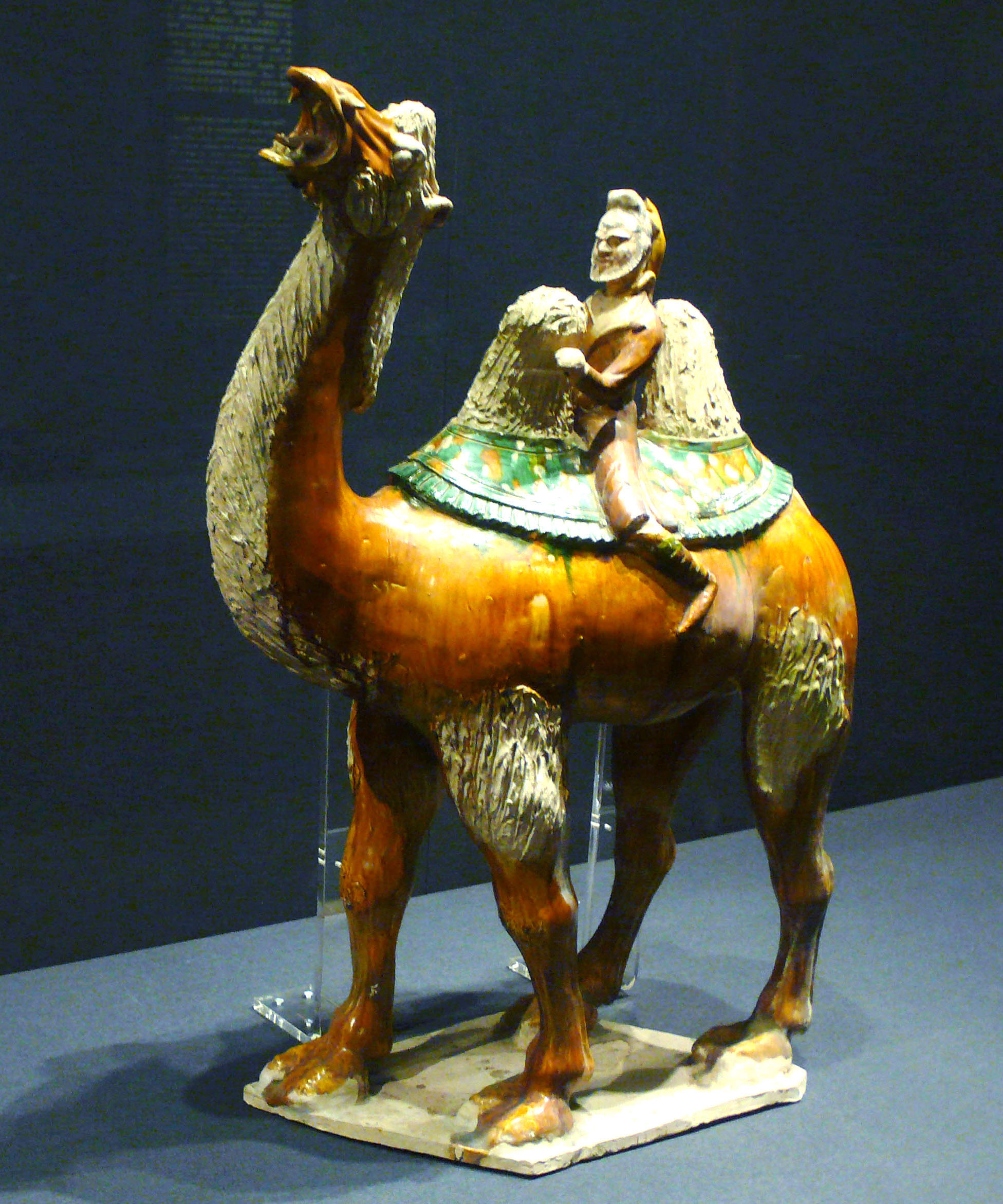
Tang Sancai camel with a merchant

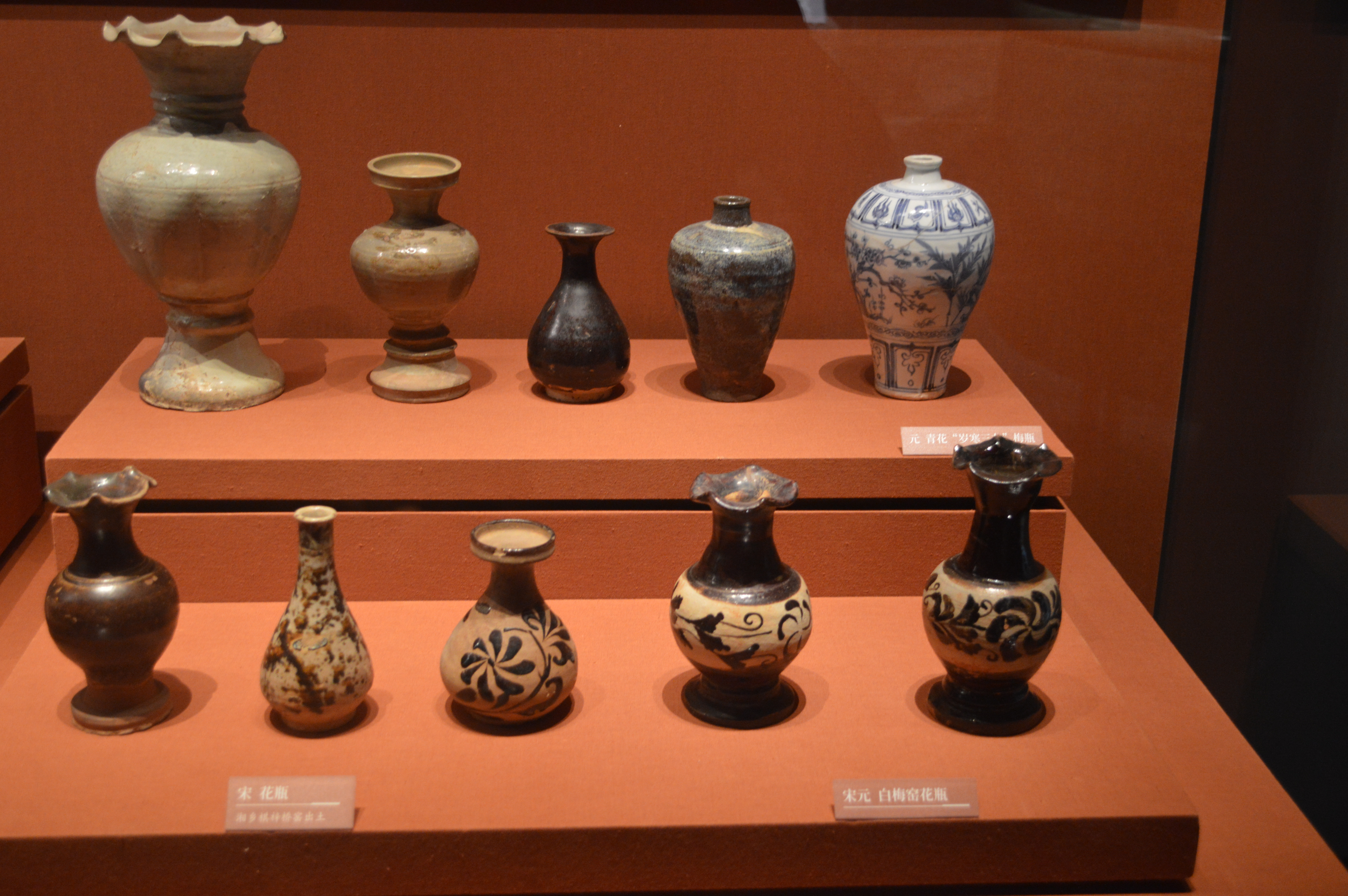
Porcelain vases, Song dynasty, Hunan Museum

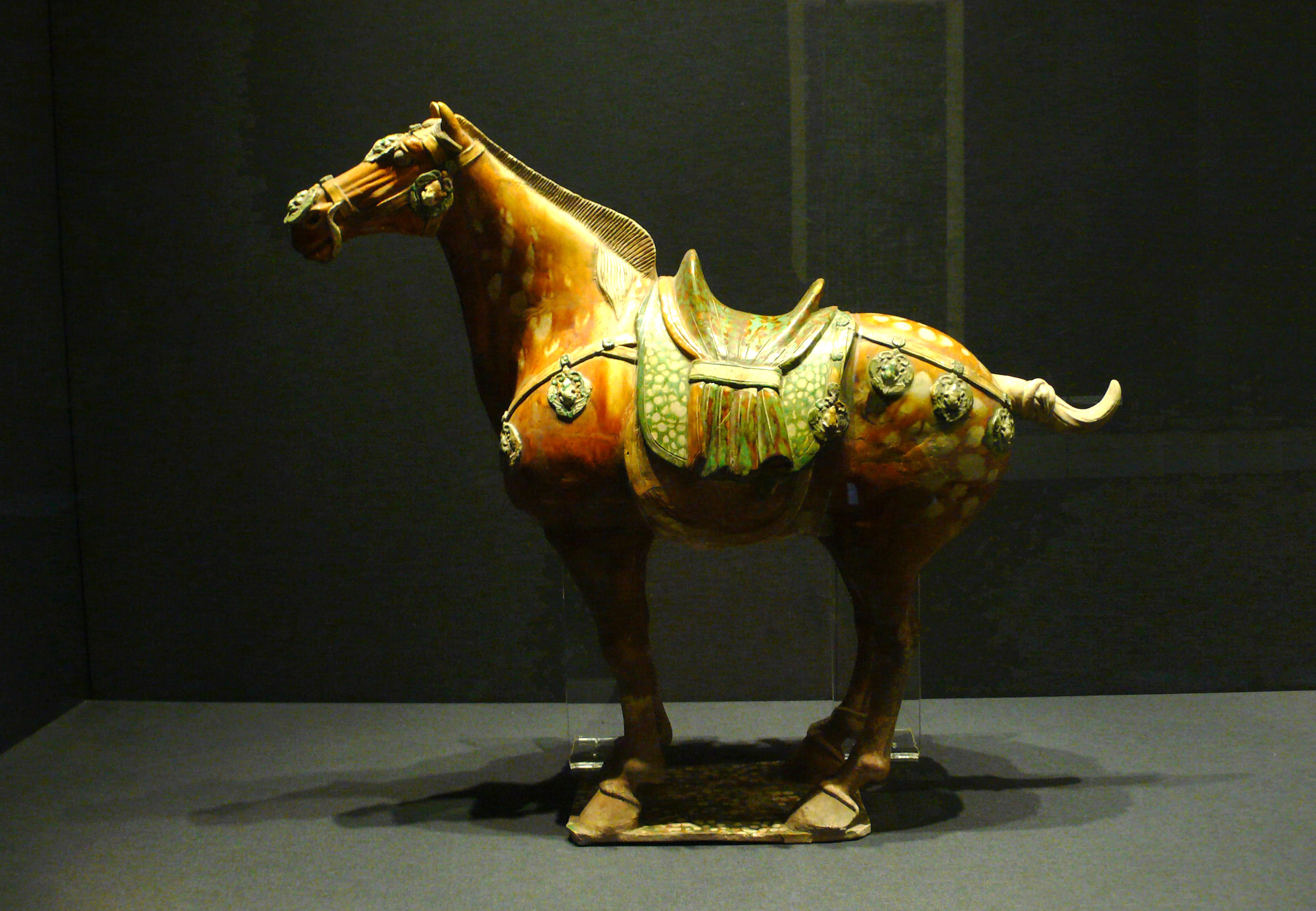
Sancai in Tang

The development of porcelain technology in Song dynasty is unprecedented, with multifarious vessel shapes and rich and colourful decorative patterns. It does not means that there is no change in the aesthetics in Song. In contrast, people in Song dynasty pursued the charm of extreme in aspect of porcelain. The contents of the decorative patterns have transformed into the lively flower, birds, fish or natural landscape, which needs various complicated techniques to accomplish. Even if there is no pattern in some porcelains, then the shapes and glazing colour will be the primary artistic appreciations. There are many techniques have been improved or innovated such as hollow out, embossing, appliqué (add material on the surface) and making glazing colour varying in one porcelain(the colour of glaze can look like a waterfall). The porcelain products that contain clever design, unique technique or exquisite craftsmanship are praised and pursued as Song dynasty was a period of highly developed science and technology as well as prosperity of porcelain crafts.

== Popular flowers ==
There are different aesthetics in flowers as well in two dynasties. In Tang dynasty, the tree peony was more popular and beloved, while in the Song dynasty, the plum blossom was highly valued.

=== Meaning and status: ===
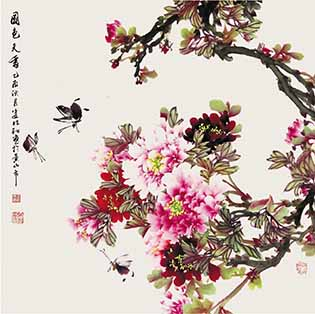
A typical image of tree peony in ancient China

Tree peony, because of its large and gorgeous flowers, is often regarded as a symbol of prosperity, splendor, wealth and rank. It is also an essential symbol of the glorious and prosperous age of the Tang dynasty. Usually, its beauty gives a graceful, noble impression to people.

This can be seen from the numerous related works. For example, the great poet Li Bai (李白) in Tang composed a series of typical and famous poems using tree peony to describe the beauty of the imperial concubine, Yang Yuhuan (杨玉环), and here is one of them:

In iridescent raiment, she looks lovely like the flower
But when bedewed or caressed by the vernal breeze, she’d look even prettier
And pampered by the monarch’s affection, she could never be outshone
Oh, a divinity she must be, diving into our mundane life just off and on (Li, 1960, Vol. 27, p. 391)

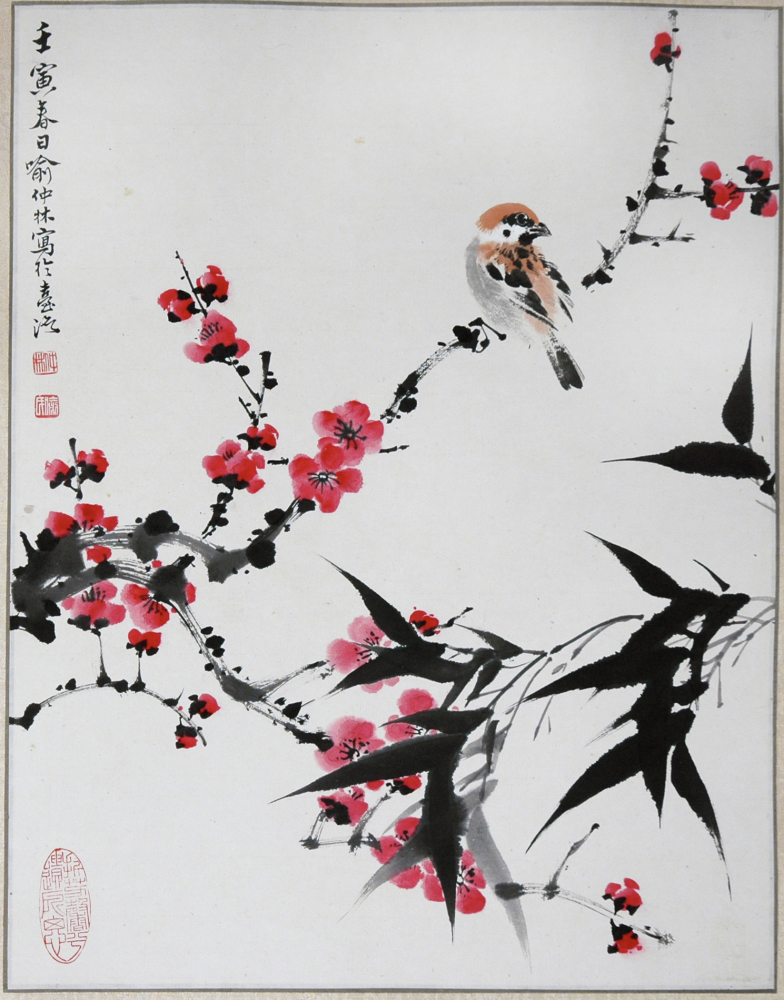
A typical image of plum blossom

Plum blossom, as a small and delicate flower, is regarded as a symbol of the spiritual quality of the Chinese nation's tenacity, perseverance and self-improvement. It reflects the cultural connotation of the Song dynasty that emphasizes elegance, rationality, and introspection.

=== Reasons for change: ===
The most salient reason for the change is the transformation of the aesthetic culture. The tree peony fits into the cultural atmosphere of prosperity, tolerance and freedom in the Tang dynasty. However, in the Song dynasty, the rise and development of Neo-Confucianism theory motivated the artists and literature to emphasise the moral quality and aesthetic taste in a sublime way. There were plenty of criticisms, such as “beauty is bound to shatter public morals”, inflicted on the tree peony after the most flourishing period of Tang dynasty, and thus the status of the tree peony was degraded. Also, the bloom of the plum blossom in cold weather conditions represented tenacious spirit, increasing people's favor of it. Because the aesthetics in Song dynasty were dominated by a rationalist way of thinking influenced by Neo-Confucianism, adoring the spirits of those can express the beautiful qualities of human beings, such as perseverance, bravery and reason.

Another possible reason is the climate that can promote further exploration and enrichment of the meaning of a national flower. For instance, in North China, tree peony grows better due to its cold and arid climate, while it may hinder the growth of plum blossom, because it favors a warm and humid climate that can be provided by Southern China. Therefore, the change is more reasonable since the most common flower is much more likely to be lucky enough to be given the beautiful meanings by people intellectually.

== Literature form ==
There are mainly five genres in ancient Chinese literature that refers to poetry, while in Tang and Song dynasties the Shi and Ci achieved dominance. The form of Shi is fully developed in the climax of the Tang dynasty, and there is rarely text wrote in form of Ci. Usually, Shi is following a strict pattern in terms of even-length style, rhyme, which means there are five characters or seven characters and a similar vowel in the end of every line. Sometimes, the regular style of Shi is characterised by the equal length with six syllables. However, Ci is the dominant literature form in the Song dynasty since it becomes separated from Shi and develops rapidly. It is a literary form based on songs in which invites new words to fill and maintain the original patterns. As being a more unrestricted form of poetry comparing to the Shi, Ci allows writers to compose more freely. It is more suitable to be wrote to express emotions and record realistic actual events.

As for the literary orientation, poems in Tang and Song Dynasties are in different tendency. The society is open to the world and exotic during the Tang dynasty. With a stable political environment and powerful economic and military strength, China in Tang dynasty is a great nation for people to reside in and for poets to compose. Thus, the contents are more related to adventures in frontier, personal sentiment. By contrast, the daily life, social responsibility, politics, national situation and contemplation of philosophy are more involved in Song dynasty.

However, because of the development and dominance of the examinations for officials instituted in Tang and Song Dynasties that needs profound and solid foundation of writing, higher literary ability are commanded and advocated in society. Moreover, the poetry including Shi and Ci are considered as "the most refined and elevated means of expression" which require significant literary skills, becoming appreciated and adorable. Gradually, these literature forms become the symbol of beauty of Chinese characters due to the profound cultural meanings and literary techniques behind, which are greatly pursued.

Since the form of Shi and Ci is extremely different and distinctive, some examples are provided.

Two examples of the form of Shi in Tang dynasty in heptasyllabic (with seven characters) and pentasyllabic (with five characters) style:

白雪歌送武判官归京 （岑参） 月下独酌（李白）

北风卷地白草折，胡天八月即飞雪。 花间一壶酒，独酌无相亲。

忽如一夜春风来，千树万树梨花开。 举杯邀明月，对影成三人。

散入珠帘湿罗幕，狐裘不暖锦衾薄。 月既不解饮，影徒随我身。

将军角弓不得控，都护铁衣冷难着。 暂伴月将影，行乐须及春。

瀚海阑干百丈冰，愁云惨淡万里凝。 我歌月徘徊，我舞影零乱。

中军置酒饮归客，胡琴琵琶与羌笛。 醒时同交欢，醉后各分散。

纷纷暮雪下辕门，风掣红旗冻不翻。 永结无情游，相期邈云汉。

轮台东门送君去，去时雪满天山路。

山回路转不见君，雪上空留马行处。

Example of Ci in Song dynasty:

江城子· 密州出猎 （苏轼）

老夫聊发少年狂，左牵黄，右擎苍，锦帽貂裘，千骑卷平冈。为报倾城随太守，亲射虎，看孙郎。

酒酣胸胆尚开张，鬓微霜，又何妨？持节云中，何日遣冯唐？会挽雕弓如满月，西北望，射天狼。

== Bibliography ==
- Asian Art Musesm/Education. (2012). Porcelain in the Tang (618-906) and Song (960-1279) Dynasties. Retriebed from http://education.asianart.org/explore-resources/background-information/porcelain-tang-618%E2%80%93906-and-song- 960%E2%80%931279-dynasties
- Asian Art Musesm/Education. (2012). The Flourishing of Poetry in the Tang (618-906) and Song (960-1279) Dynasties. Retriebed from http://education.asianart.org/explore-resources/background-information/flourishing-poetry-tang-618-906-and-song-960-1279-dynasties
- Cai, Z. (2008). How to read Chinese poetry : a guided anthology. New York: Columbia University Press.
- Hua, M. (2011). Chinese clothing (Updated ed.). Cambridge ;: Cambridge University Press.
- Lomová, O. (2013). Traditional Chinese Poetry. Chinese Studies. Oxford University Press. https://doi.org/10.1093/obo/9780199920082-0005
- Li, B. (1960). Qing Ping Diao. In D. Peng (Ed.), Quan Tang Shi (Vol. 27, p. 391). Beijing, People's Republic of China: Zhonghua Shuju.
- Ye, Z. (2003). General survey of Chinese ceramic[s] during Sui, Tang, Song and. Yuan Dynasties (581-1368). The Forbidden City Publishing House.
- Ying, W. (2018). A National Flower’s Symbolic Value During the Tang and Song Dynasties in China. Space and Culture, 21(1), 46–59. https://doi.org/10.1177/1206331217749765
- Wang, Z. “Evolution of Ci Poetry of the Dynasties of Tang and Song in the Perspective of Dissociation and Integration of Shi and Ci.” Frontiers of Literary Studies in China 1, no. 3 (2007): 449–475. http://booksandjournals.brillonline.com/content/journals/10.1007/s11702-007-0021-7.
