= Ji Gong =

Chinese Buddhist monk (1130–1209)

- 濟公
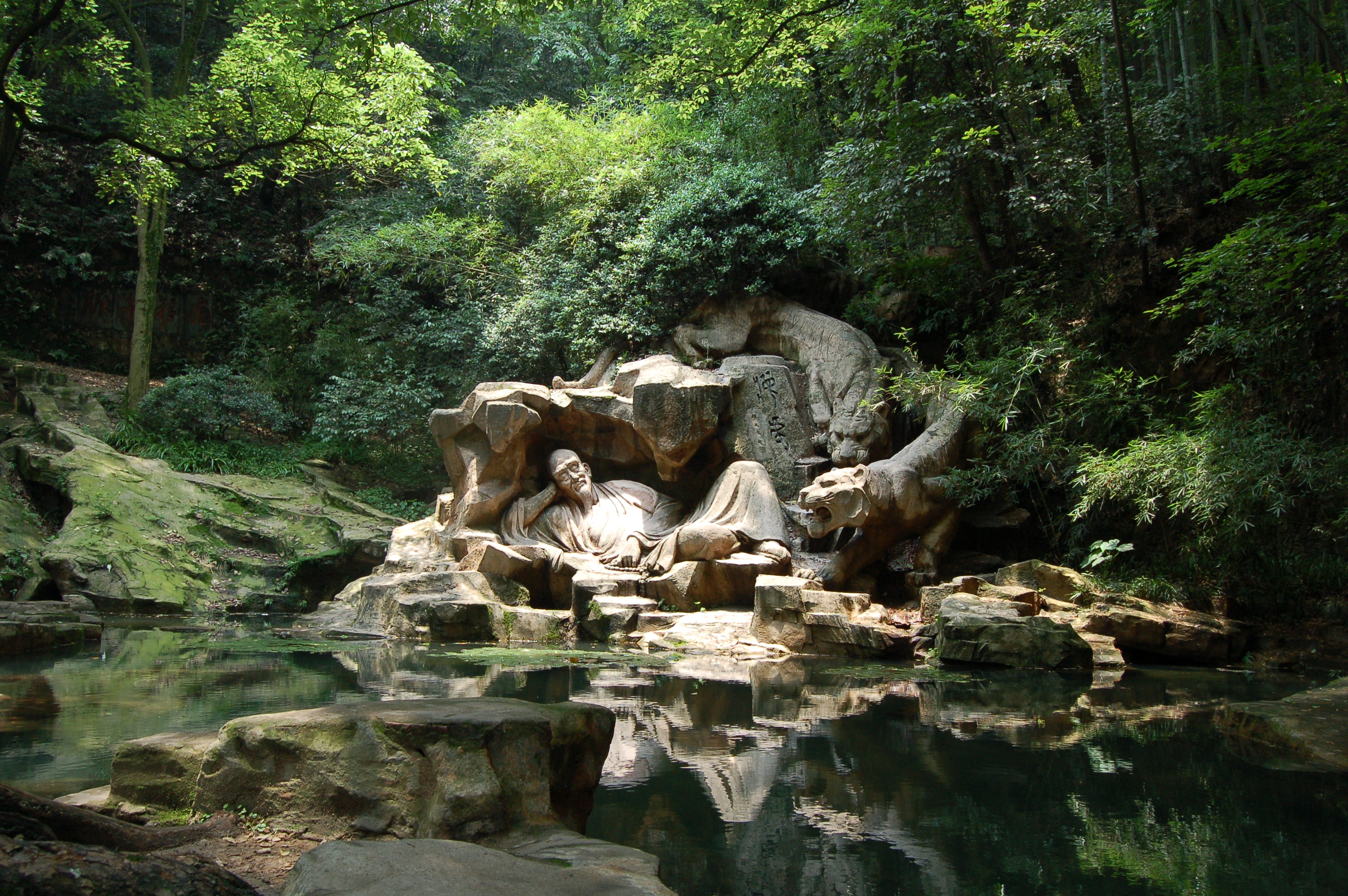
- A reclining statue of Ji Gong at Hupao Spring, his burial place

Personal life
- Born: Li Xiuyuan; 22 December 1130 Tiantai County, Taizhou, Liangzhe, Southern Song
- Died: 16 May 1209 (aged 78) Jingci Temple, Hangzhou, Southern Song
- Home town: Tiantai County, Taizhou, Liangzhe, Southern Song
- Parents: Li Maochun (father); Lady Wang (mother)
- Other name: Chan Master Daoji

Religious life
- Religion: Chan Buddhism
- Temple: Lingyin Temple
- Monastic name: Daoji

Senior posting
- Teacher: Huiyuan
- Period in office: Southern Song

Ji Gong
- Traditional Chinese: 濟公
Transcriptions
Standard Mandarin
- Hanyu Pinyin: Jì Gōng
Hakka
- Pha̍k-fa-sṳ: Chi-Kûng
Yue: Cantonese
- Jyutping: Zai3 Gung1
Southern Min
- Hokkien POJ: Tsè-kong

Chan Master Daoji
- Traditional Chinese: 道濟禪師
Transcriptions
Standard Mandarin
- Hanyu Pinyin: Dàojì Chánshī
Hakka
- Pha̍k-fa-sṳ: Tho-Chi Shèn-sṳ̂
Yue: Cantonese
- Jyutping: Dou3-zai3 Sim3-si1
Southern Min
- Hokkien POJ: Tō-Chè Siân-su

Li Xiuyuan
- Traditional Chinese: 李修緣
Transcriptions
Standard Mandarin
- Hanyu Pinyin: Lǐ Xiūyuán
Hakka
- Pha̍k-fa-sṳ: Lí-Siû-Yèn
Yue: Cantonese
- Jyutping: Lei5 Sau1-jyun4
Southern Min
- Hokkien POJ: Lí-Siu-Iân

Daoji (Chinese: 道濟, 22 December 1130 – 16 May 1209, born Li Xiuyuan), popularly known as Jigong (Chinese: 濟公), was a Chan Buddhist monk who lived in the Southern Song. He purportedly possessed supernatural powers through Buddhist practice, which he used to help the poor and stand up to injustice. However, he was also known for his wild and eccentric behavior and did not follow Buddhist monastic rules by consuming alcohol and meat. By the time of his death, Daoji had become a legend in Chinese culture and a deity in Chinese folk religion. He is mentioned by Buddhists in folktales and gong'an, and sometimes invoked by oracles to assist in worldly affairs.

== History ==
Originally named Li Xiuyuan, Jigong (濟公) was born to a former military advisor Li Maochun and his wife Lady Wang in 1130 CE (other accounts say 1148). After the death of his parents at the age of 18, Li was sent to Hangzhou and was ordained as a monk in Lingyin Temple, a temple of the Chan (Zen) school. He was mentored by the Vinaya master Huiyuan and was given the monastic name Daoji (道濟, which could be interpreted as "Helper on the Way"). Unlike traditional Buddhist monks, Daoji did not like following traditional monastic codes. He had a penchant for openly eating meat and drinking wine; his robes were often tattered and dirty from traveling from place to place, and he stumbled clumsily as he walked from intoxication. However, Daoji was kindhearted and was always ready to lend a helping hand to ordinary people. He would often treat the sick and fight against injustice. The monks, bewildered and fed up with his behavior, expelled Daoji from the monastery. From then on, Daoji roamed the streets and helped people whenever he could.

According to legend, while cultivating Buddhist practices, Daoji attained supernatural powers. Many who noticed his eccentric yet benevolent and compassionate nature began to think that he was the emanation of a bodhisattva, or the incarnation of an arhat. He was widely recognized by people as the incarnation of the Dragon Subduing Arhat (降龍羅漢, Xiánglóng Luóhàn), one of the Eighteen Arhats. Later he became known as Jigong (济公, "the Honorable Helper"), a title of respect derived from his monastic name, Daoji (道济).

Toward the end of his life, he stayed at Jingci Temple, and died on the 14th day of the 5th lunar month (May 16, 1209), around the age of 79 (or 61 according to other chronicles). Later syncretic Taoism began to revere Jigong as a deity. Not long after that, Chinese Buddhist institutions began to recognize his compassionate efforts, and was incorporated into Chinese Buddhism. He is also featured as an interlocutor in many classic gong'an of the Chan (Zen) school.

Since at least the 1869s, mediums in China have claimed to receive texts from Jigong through spirit writing, later called Fuji (扶乩; 扶箕; fújī). These messages led to a further development of Jigong worship, which was actively promoted by the monk Falun (法輪) at Hupao Temple (虎跑寺; Hǔpǎo Sì) in Hangzhou, where Jigong's grave is located. The channeled messages gradually acquired a moralistic tone, recommending charitable activities. Jigong's messages received through 'spirit writing' played a role in the establishment of the Benevolent Relief Society (救濟善會; Jiùjì Shànhuì), whose leaders later participated in the foundation of the Red Cross Society of China.

A new Buddhist movement, the Hong Kong-based Tung Cheng Yuen Buddhist Association (東井圓佛會; Dōngjǐng Yuánfú Huì), worship Jigong. Yiguandao has also adopted him into their pantheon of deities, citing Zhang Tianran, contemporary founder of the Yiguandao, as his reincarnation.

== Depiction ==
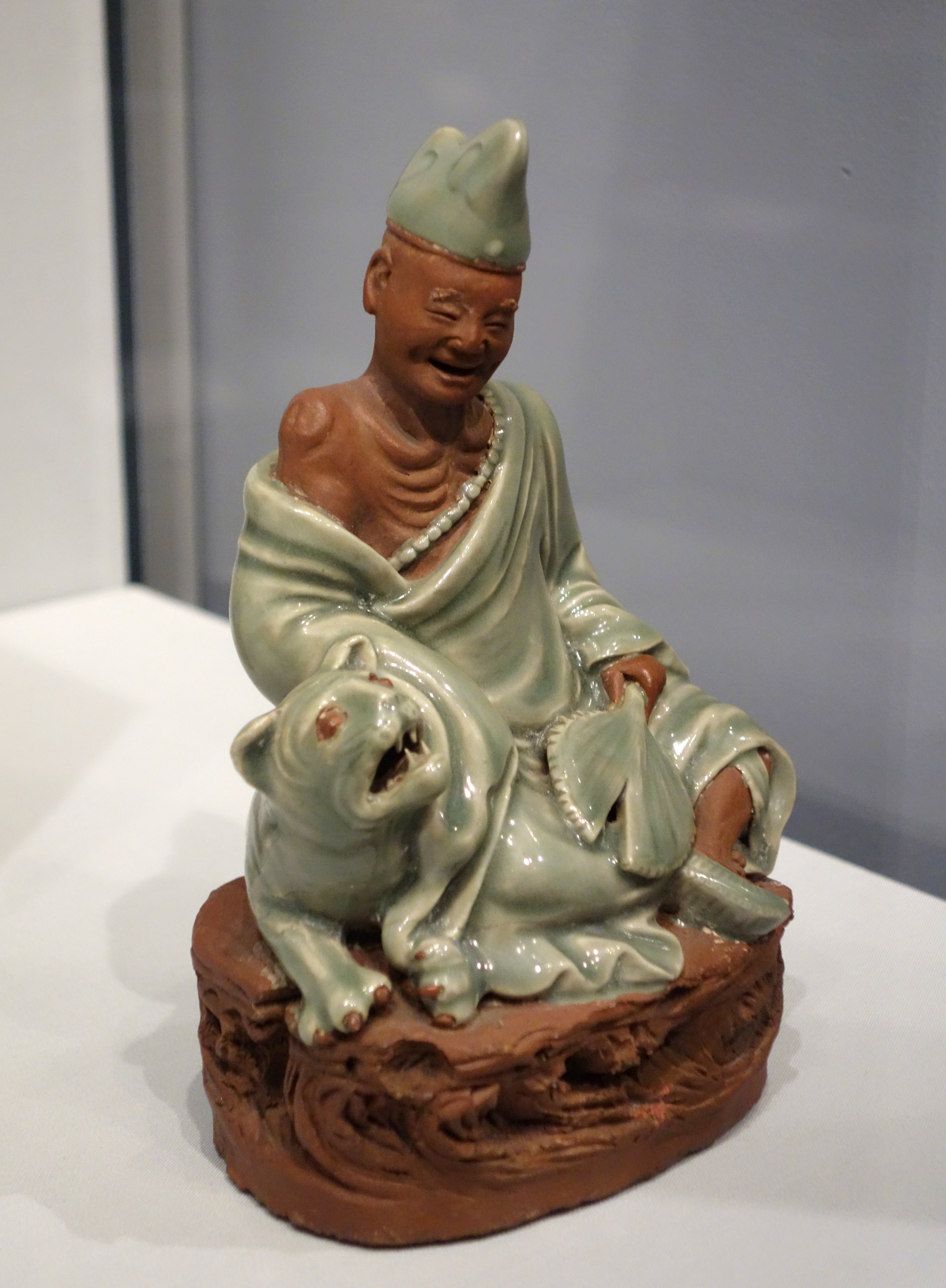
Statue of Ji Gong, Ming dynasty, Asian Art Museum

Jigong can usually be seen smiling in tattered monastic robes and oversized bead necklaces. He usually carries a bottle of wine in his right hand, and a fan in his left hand. He wears a hat with the Chinese character Fo (佛), meaning "Buddha". He can also be seen holding his shoes in his right hand. Because of his carefree nature, he is rarely ever shown with a serious facial expression.

== In popular culture ==
Jigong has been portrayed by numerous actors in films and television series from as early as 1939.

=== Books ===
Chinese novel Jigong Quan Zhuang (濟公全傳) by Guo Xiaoting (郭小亭). Adventures of the Mad Monk Jigong: The Drunken Wisdom of China's Most Famous Chan Buddhist Monk, Guo Xiaoting; John Robert Shaw trs., Tuttle Publishing, 2014.

=== Films ===
- The Living Buddha (濟公活佛), a 1939 Hong Kong film starring Yee Chau-sui.
- Jigong, Reincarnated Buddha (濟公活佛), 1949 Hong Kong film starring Yee Chau-sui.
- How the Monk Chai Kung Thrice Insulted Wah Wan-Lung (濟公三氣華雲龍), a 1950 Hong Kong film starring Yee Chau-sui.
- The Mischievous Magic Monk (濟公傳), a 1954 Hong Kong film starring Hung Boh.
- A New Tale of the Monk Jigong (A New Tale of the Monk Jigong), a 1954 Hong Kong film starring Leung Sing-bo.
- Jigong Sets the Fire on the Impenetrable Pi-pa Spirit (濟公火燒琵琶精), a 1958 Hong Kong film starring Leung Sing-bo.
- Jigong, the Living Buddha (濟公活佛), a 1964 Hong Kong film starring Sun Ma Sze Tsang.
- A Modern Jigong (摩登濟公), a 1965 Hong Kong film starring Sun Ma Sze Tsang.
- Jigong Raids the Courtroom (濟公大鬧公堂), a 1965 Hong Kong film starring Sun Ma Sze Tsang.
- Jigong Is After the Demon (濟公捉妖), a 1965 Hong Kong film starring Sun Ma Sze Tsang.
- Jigong and the 8 Immortals (濟公鬥八仙), a 1966 Hong Kong film starring Sun Ma Sze Tsang.
- The Magnificent Monk (濟公活佛), a 1969 Hong Kong film starring Cheung Kwong-chiu.
- The Living Buddha Chikung (濟公活佛), a 1975 Hong Kong film starring Yueh Yang.
- The Mad Monk (佛跳牆), a 1977 Hong Kong film produced by the Shaw Brothers Studio, starring Julie Yeh Feng.
- The Mad Monk Strikes Again (烏龍濟公), a 1978 Hong Kong film produced by the Shaw Brothers Studio, starring Julie Yeh Feng.
- Xin Jigong Huo Fo (新濟公活佛), a 1982 Taiwanese film starring Hsu Pu-liao.
- The Mad Monk (濟公), a 1993 Hong Kong film starring Stephen Chow.
- Jigong: Gu Cha Fengyun (濟公·古剎風雲), a 2010 Chinese film starring You Benchang.
- Jigong: Cha Yi You Dao (濟公·茶亦有道), a 2010 Chinese film starring You Benchang.

=== Television series ===
- Xianglong Luohan (降龍羅漢), a 1984 Taiwanese television series produced by CTV, starring Hsu Pu-liao.
- Jigong (濟公), a 1985 Chinese television series produced by Shanghai TV and Hangzhou TV, starring You Benchang.
- Hutu Shenxian (糊塗神仙), a 1986 Taiwanese television series produced by TTV, starring Lung Kuan-wu.
- Buddha Jih (濟公), a 1986 Hong Kong television series divided into a 2 part series, produced by ATV, starring Lam Kwok-hung.
- Daxiao Jigong (大小濟公), a 1987 Taiwanese television series produced by CTS, starring Shih Ying.
- Kuaile Shenxian (快樂神仙), a 1987 Taiwanese television series produced by TTV, starring Cheng Ping-chun.
- Jigong (濟公), a 1988 Chinese television series produced by Shanghai TV and Hangzhou TV, starring You Benchang and Lü Liang.
- Jigong Huo Fo (濟公活佛), a 1989 Chinese television series produced by CTPC and Ningbo Film Company, starring You Benchang.
- Jigong Xin Zhuan (濟公新傳), a 1991 Taiwanese television series produced by CTV, starring Ku Pao-ming.
- Jigong (濟公), a 1995 Taiwanese television series produced by TTV, starring Chou Ming-tseng.
- The Legends of Jigong (濟公活佛), a 1996 Singaporean television series produced by TCS (now Mediacorp), starring Xie Shaoguang.
- Jigong Huo Fo (濟公活佛), a 1997 Taiwanese television series produced by CTV, starring Chou Ming-tseng and Lin You-hsing.
- The Legend of Master Chai (濟公), a 1997 Hong Kong television series produced by TVB, starring Joey Leung.
- Jigong You Ji (濟公游記), a 1998 Chinese television series produced by Zhejiang TV, starring You Benchang.

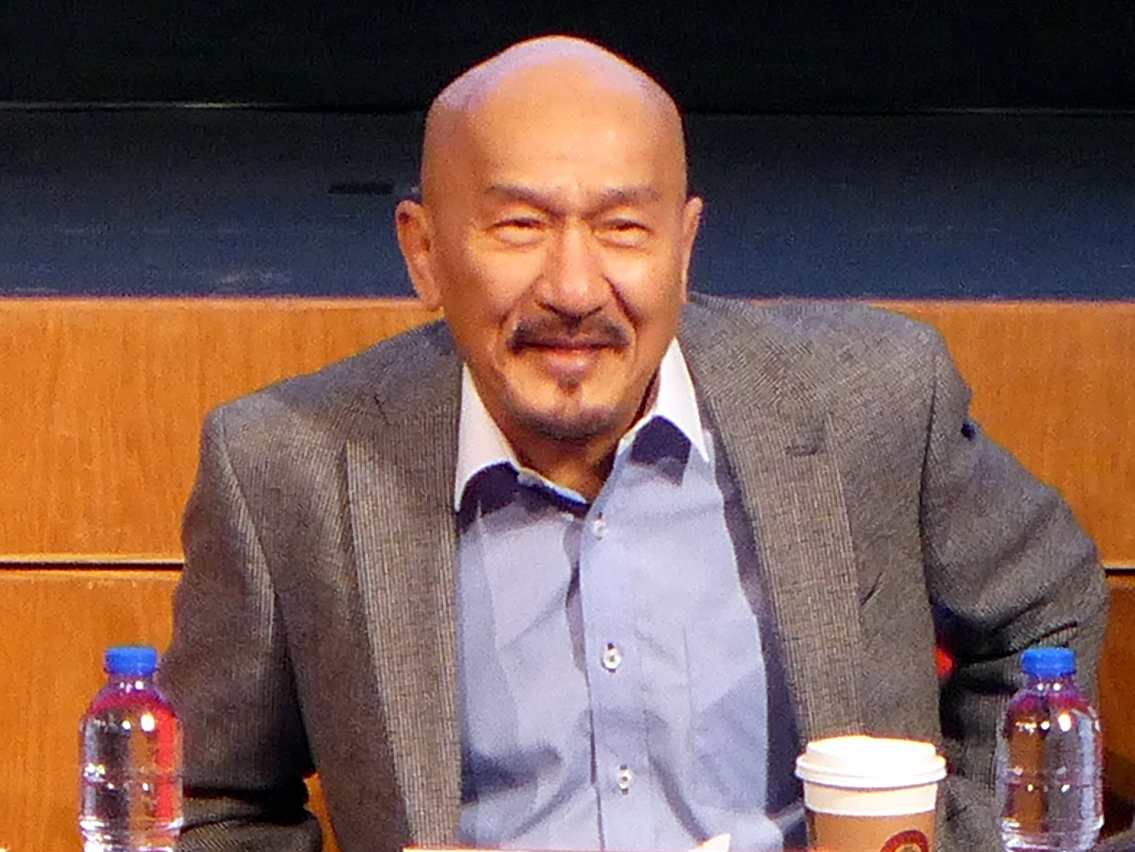
Karl Maka, known for his role as Jigong in Zen Master (2001).

- Zen Master (濟公傳奇), a 2001 Hong Kong television series attributed from the 1986 series: Buddha Jih.produced by ATV, starring Karl Maka.
- Jigong (濟公), a 2007 Taiwanese television series produced by Formosa Television, starring Lung Shao-hua.
- The Legend of Crazy Monk (活佛濟公), a three-season Chinese television series produced by Shanghai Chongyuan Cultural Company and Hangzhou Baicheng Media Company, starring Benny Chan. The three seasons were released between 2009 and 2011.
- New Mad Monk (濟公活佛), a 2013 Chinese television series after Stephen Chow's The Mad Monk.produced by Lafeng Entertainment, starring Benny Chan.
- American Born Chinese, a 2023 American television series based on the graphic novel of the same name produced for Disney+, starring Ronny Chieng.
