= Mad Monk =

Mad Monk may refer to:

- Ji Gong, a Buddhist monk who lived during the Song dynasty
  - The Mad Monk (1993), a fantasy film about Ji Gong's life starring Stephen Chow
- Nickname of Tony Abbott, an Australian politician
- Nickname of British politician Keith Joseph
