= The Legends of Jigong =

Singaporean television series

- Poster
- Traditional Chinese: 活佛濟公
- Simplified Chinese: 活佛济公
- Hanyu Pinyin: Huó Fó Jì Gōng
- Genre: Chinese mythology fiction
- Screenplay by: Wang Qiji; Yue Tian
- Directed by: Lu Cijin; Lin Lihong
- Starring: Xie Shaoguang; Yao Wenlong; Ann Kok
- Theme music composer: Chen Jiaming
- Opening theme: “Who Am I” (我是谁) performed by Xie Shaoguang
- Country of origin: Singapore
- Original language: Mandarin
- No. of episodes: 30

Production
- Producer: Li Ningqiang
- Production location: Singapore
- Editor: Li Junmei
- Running time: 45 minutes per episode
- Production company: TCS

Original release
- Network: TCS Eighth Frequency

The Legends of Jigong is a Singaporean television series based on legends about Ji Gong (1130–1207), a Chinese Buddhist monk who is revered as a deity in Chinese folk religion and folk hero in Chinese culture. It was produced by the Television Corporation of Singapore (TCS) and was first aired in Singapore on TCS Eighth Frequency (now MediaCorp Channel 8) in 1996. Xie Shaoguang, who portrayed Ji Gong and sang the theme song for the series, was nominated for the Best Actor award at the 1997 Star Awards.

== Plot ==
Ji Gong was originally the Taming Dragon Arhat, one of the Eighteen Arhats. His apprentice, Golden Boy, accidentally allowed the unruly White Tiger Star under his watch to escape from the celestial realm into the human world to cause trouble. Through cunning manipulations and machinations, the White Tiger Star causes the death of the patriotic Song dynasty general Yue Fei, absorbs the energy from Yue Fei's guardian star, and becomes more powerful in the process. As a punishment for his failure to stop the White Tiger Star, Ji Gong is banished to the human world, where he is reincarnated as Li Xiuyuan. In the human world, he is destined to do good deeds such as fighting injustice and helping the poor, as well as to continue his quest of taming the White Tiger Star. He has various allies and friends, including Golden Boy, all of their romantic relationships often intertwining with the problem of the day that Ji Gong intends to solve.

== Cast ==
- Xie Shaoguang as Ji Gong / Taming Tiger Arhat
- Yao Wenlong as Golden Boy
- Ann Kok as Yue Yinping / Li Xiaomei
- Ryan Choo as Yue Lei / Yu Hai
- Deng Shufang as Ziyi / Mo-niang
- Huang Shinan as Yue Fei
- Li Xuehuan as Yue Fei's wife
- Wu Ge as Qin Hui
- Zhu Xiufeng as Madam Wang (Qin Hui's wife)
- Brandon Wong as Qin Dai / Bai An
- Zheng Geping as White Tiger Star / Yang Qingfeng
- Zhong Shurong as Fan Zengxi
- Guan Xuemei as Fan Zengxi's wife
- Zhang Jinhua as the Queen Mother of Heaven
- Liang Tian as Taishang Laojun
- Bai Yan as the Earth Deity
- Lin Yongkun as Hu Ban Xian
- Chen Guohua as brothel owner
- Lan Zhenyi as Xiaocui
- Huang Guoxiong as Yue Yun
- Hua Shibin as Zhang Bao
- Lin Xinghong as Zhang Xian

== See also ==
- Ji Gong, the main character in the series.
- Other media about Ji Gong:
  - Ji Gong (TV series), a 1985 Chinese television series starring You Benchang and Lü Liang
  - The Mad Monk, a 1993 Hong Kong film starring Stephen Chow
  - The Legend of Crazy Monk, a 2009–2011 three-season Chinese television series starring Benny Chan
