= Ji Gong (TV series) =

- Also known as: The Mad Monk
- Traditional Chinese: 濟公
- Simplified Chinese: 济公
- Hanyu Pinyin: Jì Gōng
- Genre: Chinese mythology, fantasy, historical
- Based on: Ji Gong
- Written by: Qiao Gufan; Qian Shiming; Xue Jiazhu
- Directed by: Zhang Ge
- Starring: You Benchang; Lü Liang
- Opening theme: You Benchang Xie'erpo, Mao'erpo (鞋儿破帽儿破)
- Country of origin: China
- Original language: Mandarin
- No. of seasons: 2
- No. of episodes: 12

Production
- Production location: Lingyin Temple
- Cinematography: Zhang Xinfa
- Production companies: Hangzhou Television; Shanghai Television

Ji Gong (Chinese: 济公; pinyin: Jì Gōng) is a 1985 Chinese mythology fantasy television series directed by Zhang Ge, and starring You Benchang and Lü Liang as the "Mad Monk" Ji Gong, a popular Chinese folklore figure from the Southern Song dynasty (1127–1279).

== Production ==
The character Ji Gong took inspiration from a popular Chinese folklore figure Ji Gong from the Southern Song dynasty. You Benchang stated that Ji Gong is heavily influenced by Charlie Chaplin, the British silent film maestro. "First it is very humorous and comedic. Secondly it sincerely advocates sincerity, kindness and beauty. However, it does not ruthlessly beat the false and the evil but instead educates them, making them realize their faults and helping them to amend them. It is full of love and mercy, not only to human beings but to all creatures. It shows that everything can be taught to be good...Chaplin very much as he has taught me a lot about mime," he said.

== Critical reception ==
The television series received positive reviews. In 1985, streets in towns and cities across China were expected to empty soon as people gathered in front of televisions to watch the hot TV series. The series has been replayed many times in the years since.

== Awards and nominations ==
Award	Category	Nominee	Result	Notes
4th China TV Golden Eagle Award	Best Actor	You Benchang	Won	

== See also ==
- Ji Gong, the main character in the series.
- Other media about Ji Gong:
  - The Mad Monk, a 1993 Hong Kong film starring Stephen Chow
  - The Legends of Jigong, a 1997 Singaporean television series starring Xie Shaoguang
  - The Legend of Crazy Monk, a 2009–2011 three-season Chinese television series starring Benny Chan
