= Benny Chan (actor) =

Hong Kong actor and singer

- 陳浩民
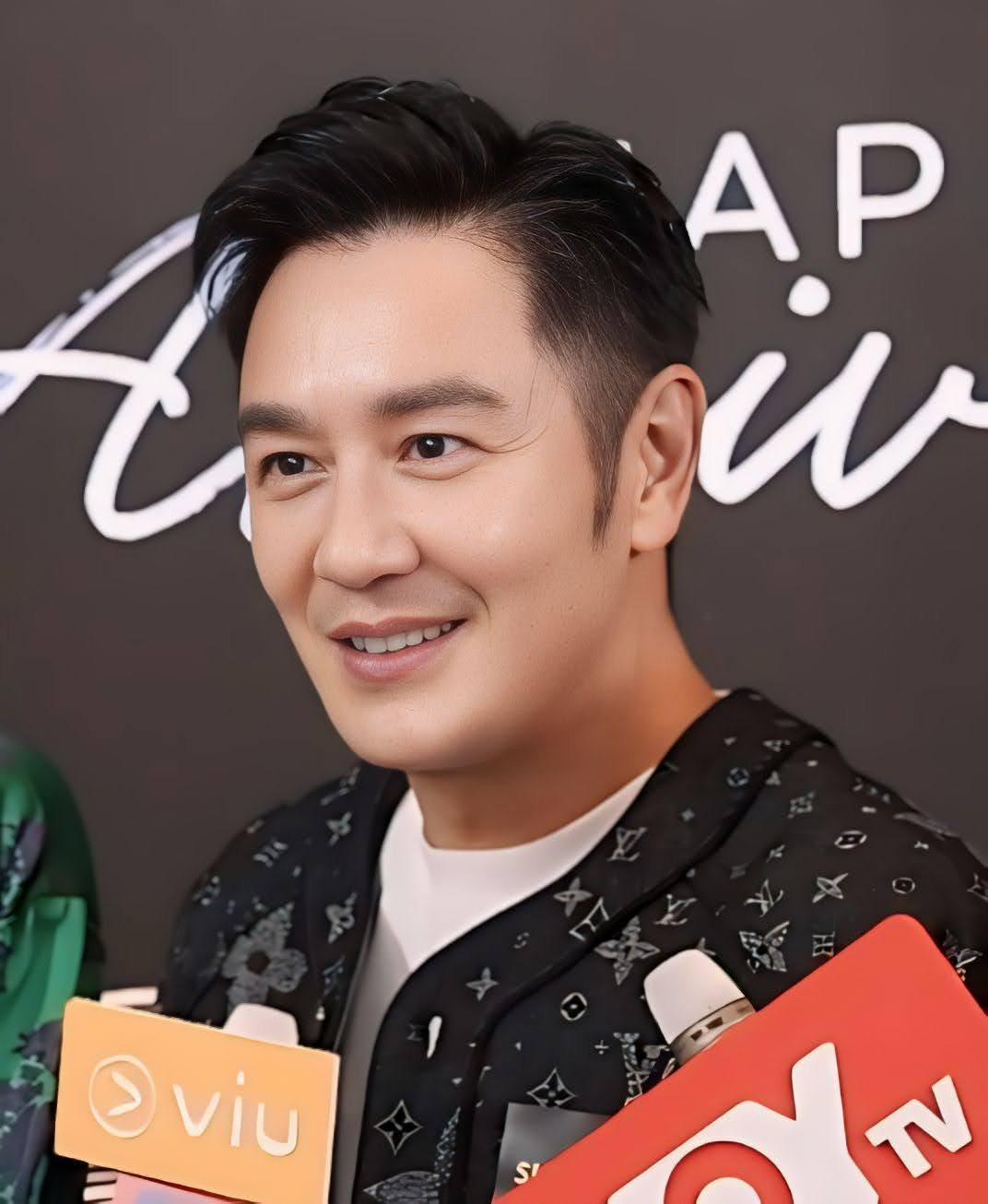
- Chan in March 2024
- Born: British Hong Kong
- Other name: Chan Ho Man
- Education: Lingnan University
- Occupations: Actor; singer
- Years active: 1996–present
- Spouse: Lisa Jiang (m. 2011)
- Children: 4

Chinese name
- Traditional Chinese: 陳浩民
- Simplified Chinese: 陈浩民
Transcriptions
Standard Mandarin
- Hanyu Pinyin: Chén Hàomín
Yue: Cantonese
- Jyutping: Can4 Hou6-man4
- Musical career
- Genre: Pop

Signature
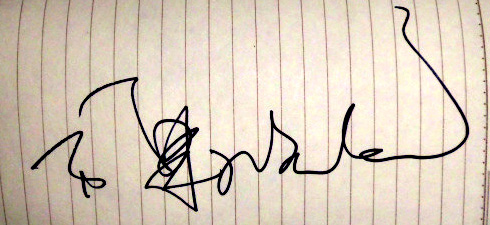

Benny Chan Ho-man is a Hong Kong actor and singer.

== Education ==
Chan attended Raimondi College. He graduated with a bachelor's degree in social science from Lingnan University.

== Acting career ==
Chan's career in the entertainment industry began in 1994 when he appeared in a television commercial for Vitasoy. He later joined TVB and acted in many television dramas produced by the company. Some of his best-known roles include Duen Yu in Demi-Gods and Semi-Devils (1997), Sun Wukong in Journey to the West II (1998), and Na-tsa in Gods of Honour (2001).

Since the early 2000s, he has become less active in Hong Kong, and has switched to working on mainland Chinese and Taiwanese television series. One of which is a series drama, The Legend of Crazy Monk, as the main protagonist Ji Gong. The drama became popular in various countries.

== Music career ==
Chan is also a singer. He has released a number of albums. His best-known song is the theme song of Journey to the West II (1998). He also sang the theme songs for Dragon Love (1999), Gods of Honour (2001), Silver Mouse (2002), Qianlong Xia Jiangnan (2003) and A Pillow Case of Mystery (2006) and the subthemes for Journey to the West II, Anti-Crime Squad (1999), Silver Mouse, Vigilante Force (2003) and Qianlong Xia Jiangnan. His rendition of Chinese versions of two Pokémon songs has won him several awards.

== Personal life ==
In 2011 Chan married Lisa Jiang Lisha (蒋丽莎), a mainland Chinese model from Hunan. Their daughter, Ya Ru Chan (陳雅薷), was born on 30 November 2011.

== Filmography ==
=== Film ===
- Love and the City (1995)
- Made in Heaven (1996)
- Last Ghost Standing (1999)
- The Final Winner (2001)
- Salon Beauty (2002)
- Love is a Butterfly (2002)
- Tai Ji Soldier (2005)
- Tragic Hero (2008)
- Iceman (2014)
- Kung Fu Boys (2016)
- Funny Soccer (2016)
- Through the Eye (2017)
- Winning Buddha (2017)
- Monster Hunt Bao Man (2017)
- Monster Hunt Bao Man 2 (2018)
- The Incredible Monk (2018)
- Million Demons City (2018)
- The Incredible Monk - Dragon Return (2018)
- Crazy Dragon (2018)
- Fake Partner (2018)
- She's a Man. He's a Woman (2019)
- Deception of the Novelist (2019)
- Kaifeng Demon (2019)
- Flirting Scholar from the Future (2019)
- Monkey King - The Volcano (2019)
- The Incredible Monk 3 (2019)
- My Kickass Wife (2019)
- Zhong Kui (2019)
- Star Master (2019)
- Master Dragon (2019)
- The Sword Legend (2019)
- Jiang Ziya (2019)
- Dragon Hunter 1 (2020)
- Monkey King (2020)
- God Erlang (2020)
- God Erlang 2 (2020)

=== Television ===
- Demi-Gods and Semi-Devils (1997)
- Dark Tales II (1998)
- Journey to the West II (1998)
- Anti-Crime Squad (1999)
- Dragon Love (1999)
- Zhuang Ya Princess (1999)
- Reaching Out (2000)
- Gods of Honour (2001)
- Silver Mouse (2002)
- Whatever It Takes (2002)
- Network Love Story (2002)
- Vigilante Force (2003)
- Qianlong Xia Jiangnan (2003)
- Carry Me Fly and Walk Off (2003)
- Love Never Dies (2003)
- Deadful Melody (2004)
- The Undercover Swordsman (2004)
- Hi-Fly (2004)
- Yan Hua San Yue (2005)
- A Pillow Case of Mystery (2006)
- The Biter Bitten (2006)
- Da Qing Hou Gong (2006)
- Love Machine (2006)
- A Change of Destiny (2007)
- Liao Zhai 2 (2007)
- Chocolate Lovers (2007)
- The Legend of Chu Liuxiang (2007)
- Justice Bao (2008)
- Legend of the Demigods (2008)
- Duo Qing Nu Ren Chi Qing Nan (2008)
- Justice Bao (2010) as Bai Yutang
- The Legend of Crazy Monk (2010)
- Love of Seven Fairy Maidens (2010)
- The Legend of Chinese Zodiac (2011)
- Da Tang Nü Xun An (2011)
- The Legend of Crazy Monk 2 (2011)
- Love Amongst War (2012)
- The Legend of Xishi (2012)
- The Legend of Crazy Monk 3 (2012)
- A Happy Life (2013)
- New Mad-Monk (2014)
- A Happy Life 2 (2016)
- The Story of Liu Hai and Jinchan (2016)
- The Legend of Beggar King and Big Foot Queen (2016)
- Deadful Melody (2018)
- Justice Sung Begins (2024)
