= Hupao Spring =

Spring in Hangzhou, China

Coordinates: 30.209°N 120.130°E

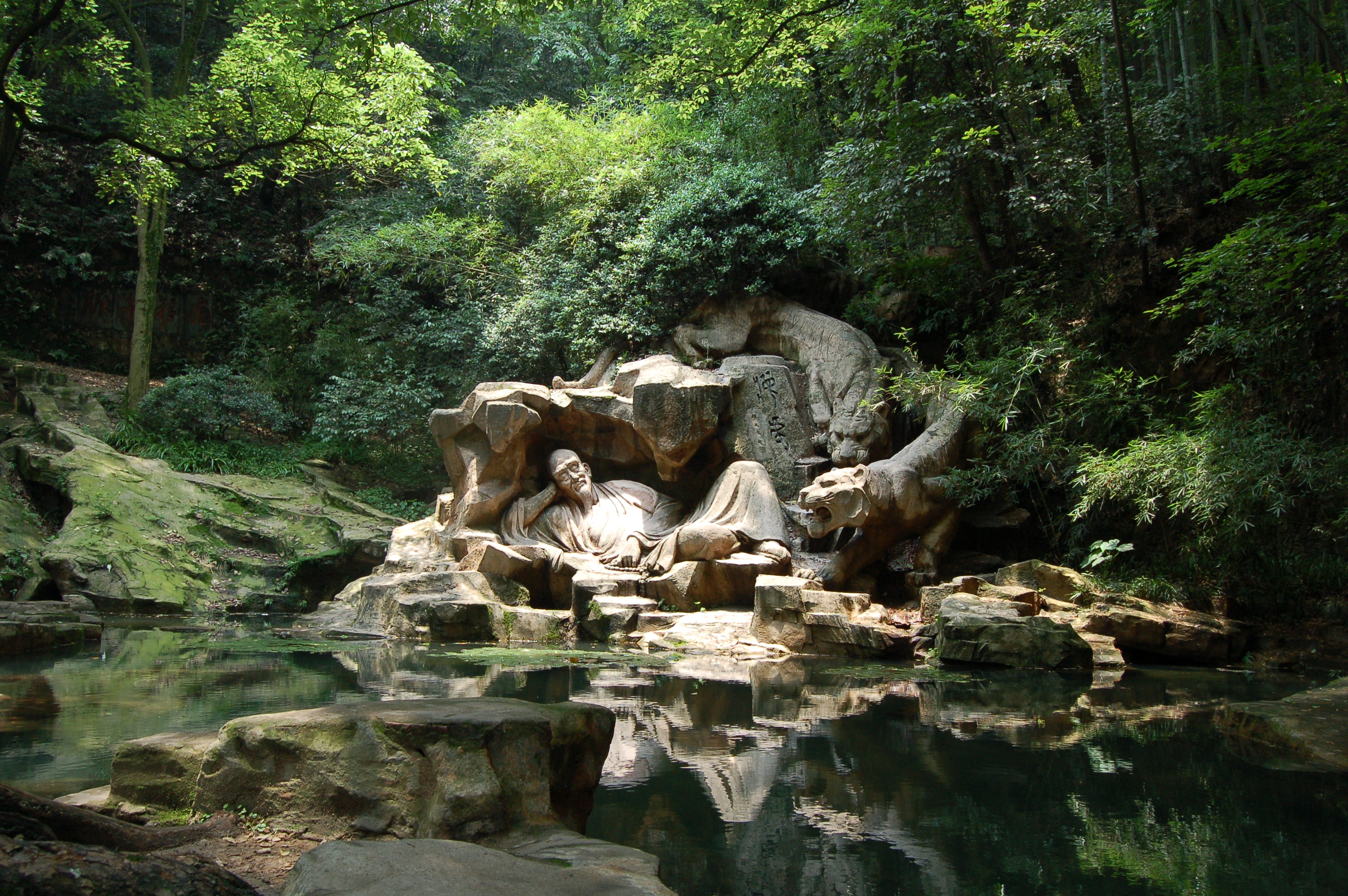
- A reclining statue of a dreaming Ji Gong next to a tiger at the spring
- Traditional Chinese: 虎跑泉
- Simplified Chinese: 虎跑泉
- Literal meaning: Spring of the Pawing of the Tiger(s)
Transcriptions
Standard Mandarin
- Hanyu Pinyin: Hǔpáo Quán
- Wade–Giles: Hu-p'ao Ch'üen

Hupaomeng Spring
- Traditional Chinese: 虎跑夢泉
- Simplified Chinese: 虎跑梦泉
- Literal meaning: Spring of the Dream of the Pawing of the Tiger(s)
Transcriptions
Standard Mandarin
- Hanyu Pinyin: Hǔpáomèng Quán
- Wade–Giles: Hu-p'ao-meng Ch'üen

Hupao or Hupaomeng Spring, also known by a variety of translated names such as Dreaming of Tiger Spring or Tiger's Run Spring, is a spring and park in southwestern Hangzhou, Zhejiang Province, China.

The water from the spring itself seeps out from quartzite and has been regarded as among the finest in China for centuries. The water is popular for brewing teas, such as the local Longjing tea. The spring is now regarded as one of the Ten Scenes of West Lake.

The Chinese verb 跑 (páo) normally refers to running, which is used in many translations of the well's name. The actual legend behind the well's name, however, derives from a separate much less common use of the verb to describe the pawing of animals. Supposedly, it was uncovered in the 9th century by wild tigers who pawed the ground to provide water for a sage hermit who lived in the area.

The spring provided water for the Dinghui Monastery formerly located nearby and was closely associated with the legendary 13th-century Buddhist monk Ji Gong, whose remains are still enshrined nearby.
