= Xianglong Luohan =

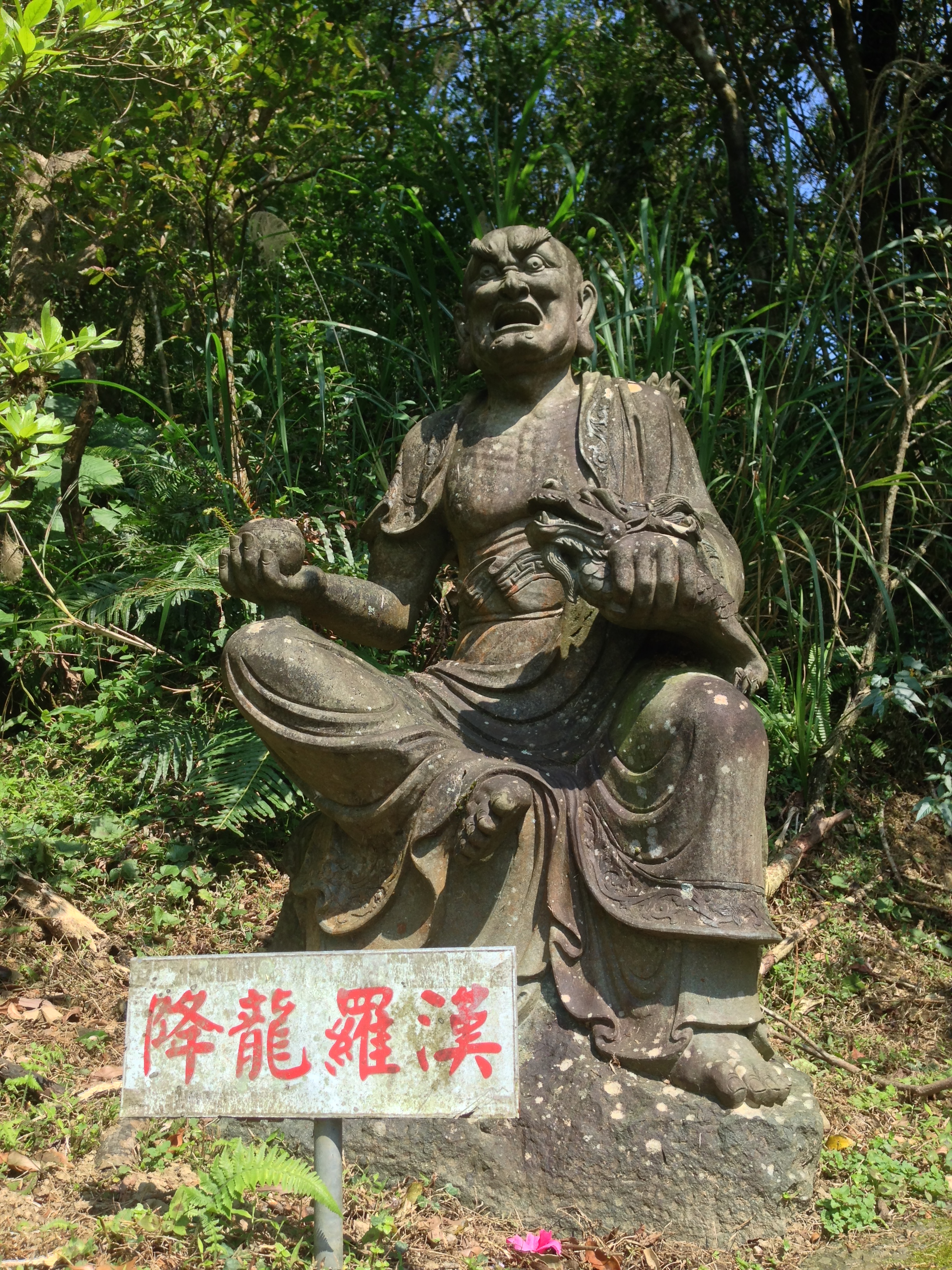
- A statue of Xianglong Luohan
- Traditional Chinese: 降龍羅漢
- Simplified Chinese: 降龙罗汉
- Literal meaning: Taming Dragon Lohan
Transcriptions
Standard Mandarin
- Hanyu Pinyin: Xiánglóng Luóhàn

Xianglong Luohan (Chinese: 降龍羅漢), also known as the Taming Dragon Arhat, is an arhat and one of the Eighteen Arhats in China. His Sanskrit name is Nandimitra (難提蜜多羅 Nántímìduōluó) and origins are said to derive from a Buddhist monk Mahākāśyapa. The legendary Chan Buddhist monk Ji Gong, was widely recognised by people as the incarnate of the Xianglong Luohan.

== Origin ==
Originally there were only sixteen arhats. Worship of a group of sixteen arhats was set forth in an Indian sutra that was translated into Chinese in the mid-seventh century. Between the late Tang dynasty and early Five Dynasties and Ten Kingdoms period of China, two additional arhats were added, one paired with a tiger and the other one with a dragon.

Xianglong Luohan is often equated with Mahākāśyapa of Buddhism, but actually, Xianglong Luohan has his own number of stories and has long been worshipped in China.

== Legend ==
According to legend, there was a dragon king in ancient India who flooded the kingdom of Nagah, hiding Buddhist scriptures in his dragon palace. Later, the venerable Arhat who subdued the dragon recovered the scriptures and performed a great feat, hence the name "Subduing the Dragon Arhat". As a disciple of the Buddha, this Arhat possessed immense supernatural powers and performed numerous extraordinary deeds, assisting the Buddha in subduing dragons and demons. Despite 1420 years of cultivation, the Arhat was unable to attain enlightenment. Seeking guidance from the Bodhisattva Guanyin, he learned that he had seven unfinished earthly lives, so he descended to the mortal realm to save sentient beings and resolve his remaining karma.

In the novel The Adventures of Ji Gong, Ji Gong is the reincarnation of the Subduing the Dragon Arhat. His monastic name is Daoji (1130–1209), also known as Ji Dian. Later, he came to be revered as Ji Gong. Born Li Xiuyuan in Yongning Village, Tiantai County, during the Southern Song dynasty, Ji Gong was a renowned Buddhist monk. With his tattered hat, broken fan, worn-out shoes, and patched robes, he often appeared eccentric. He initially ordained at Lingyin Temple in Hangzhou and later resided at Jingci Temple. Unbound by monastic rules, he had a fondness for wine and meat and behaved in a seemingly mad manner. Yet, beneath his eccentric exterior, he was a learned monk with a deep compassion for others. Known for his extensive knowledge, virtuous deeds, and skill in medicine, he cured countless people of their ailments. Renowned for his courage in righting wrongs, protecting the innocent, and punishing the wicked, Ji Gong left an enduring and unique impression on people's hearts. He is considered the 50th Patriarch of Chan Buddhism and the 6th Patriarch of the Yangqi School. His writings, including the ten-volume Juanfeng Yulu and numerous poems, are primarily collected in Jingci Temple Records and Taishan Fanxiang.

== In popular culture ==
Xianglong Luohan has been portrayed as Ji Gong in many films and television series.

- Xianglong Luohan (降龍羅漢), a 1984 Taiwanese television series produced by CTV, starring Hsu Pu-liao.

== Gallery ==
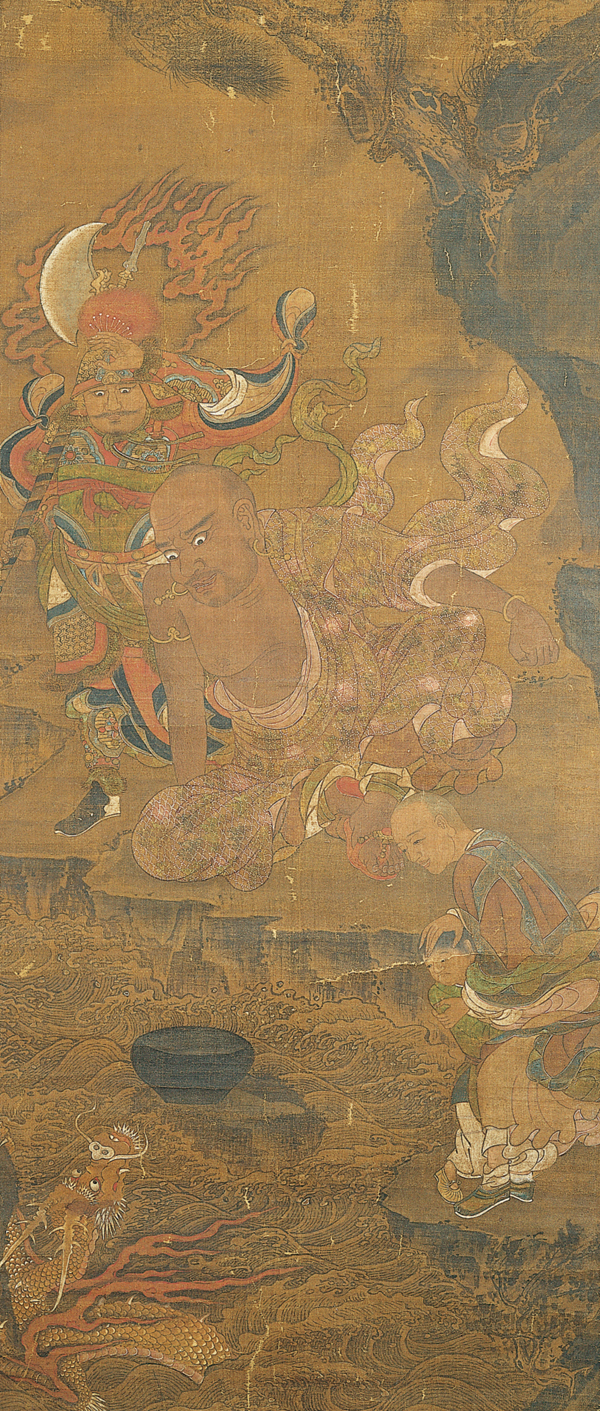
Xianglong Luohan, early 14th century, China, Yuan dynasty (1279–1368), hanging scroll; ink and mineral pigments on silk.

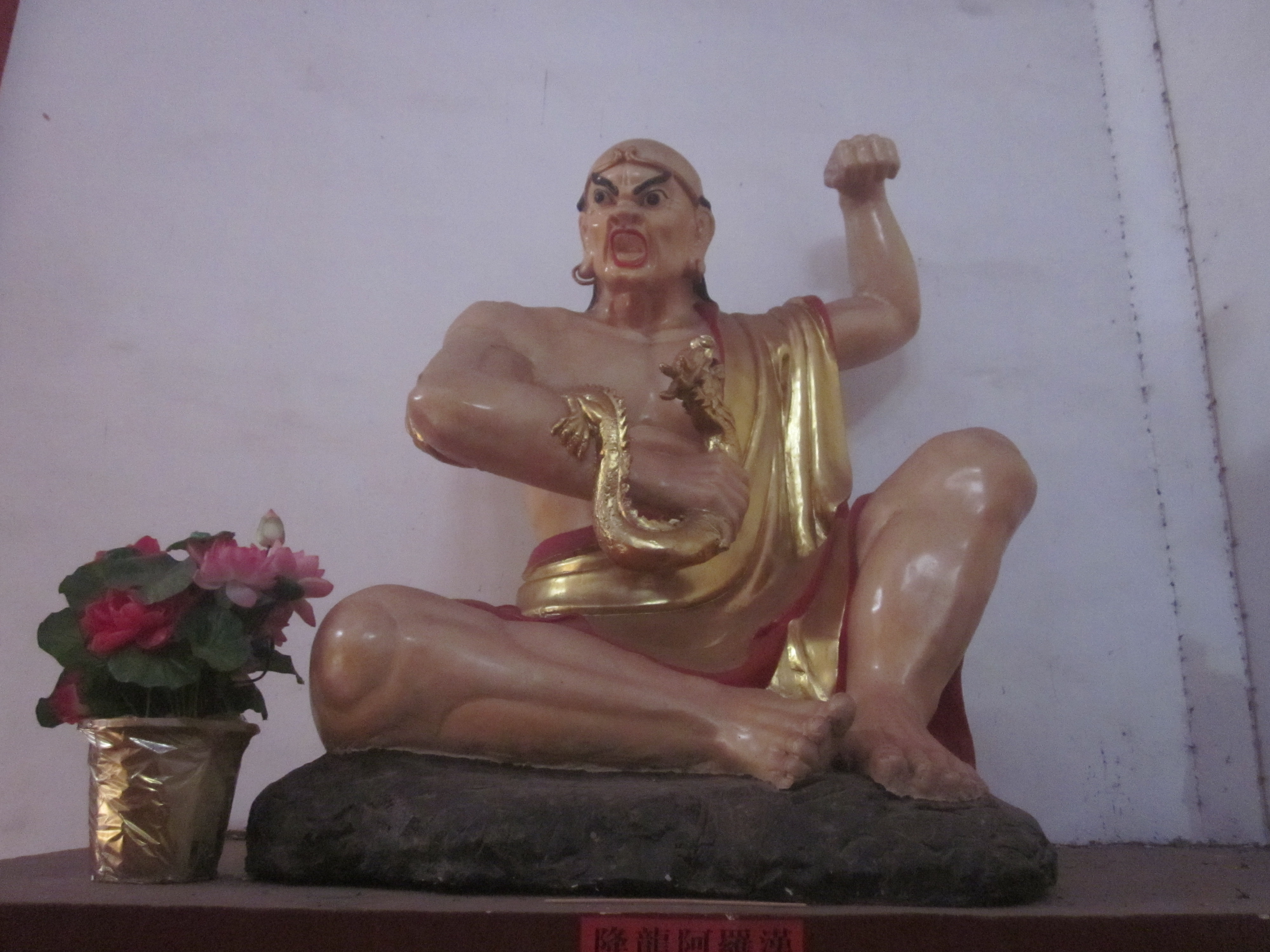
Statue of Taming Dragon Lohan in the Mahavira Hall of Nanquan Temple.

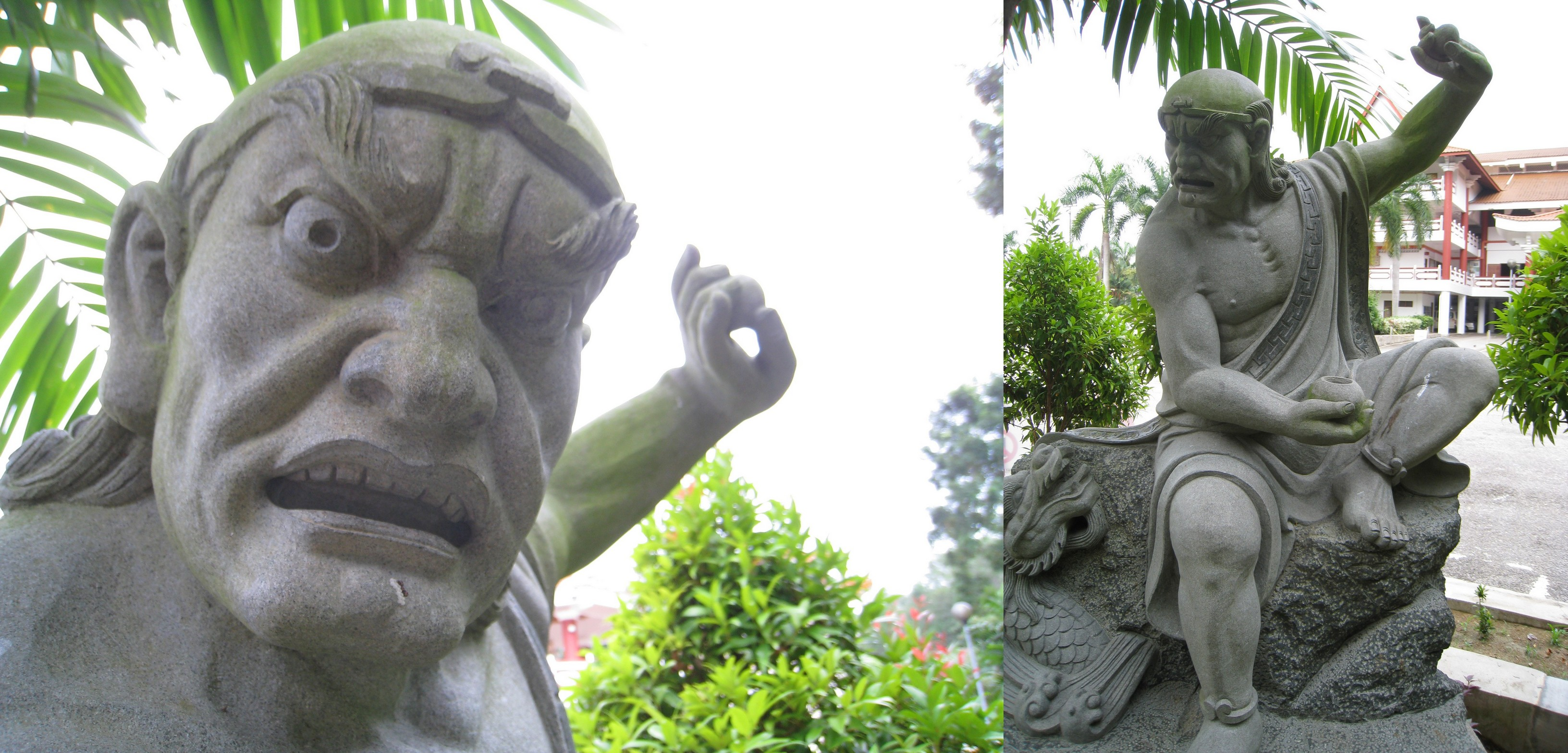
Statue in the Pahang Buddhist Association Temple, Kuantan.

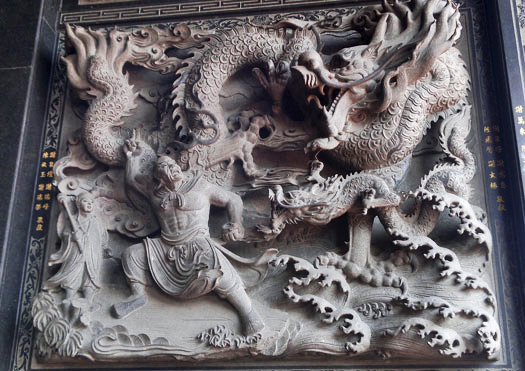
Reliefof Xianglong Luohan
