= You Benchang =

Chinese actor (1933–2026)

- 游本昌
- Born: 16 September 1933; Taizhou, Jiangsu, China
- Died: 24 September 2026 (aged 93); Beijing, China
- Education: Shanghai Theatre Academy
- Occupation: Actor
- Years active: 1959–2023
- Agent(s): Beijing Benchang Movie & TV Cultural co., ltd
- Notable work: Ji Gong
- Political party: CCP (since 2025)
- Parent: Ye Yusheng (father)
- Awards: Golden Eagle Award for Best Actor; 1986 Ji Gong

You Benchang (Chinese: 游本昌; pinyin: Yóu Běnchāng; 16 September 1933 – 24 September 2026) was a Chinese actor. He is known for his roles as Ji Gong in the television series Ji Gong, which earned him a Best Actor Award at the 4th Golden Eagle Awards.

== Early life and education ==
You was born in Taizhou, Jiangsu on 16 September 1933, and primarily studied in Shanghai and Nanjing. When he was a child, a fortune teller said that he could not live to be 13 years old unless he became a monk. So when he was 6 years old, his parents sent him to Fazang Temple (法藏寺) in Shanghai, where he received ordination as a monk under Master Xingci (兴慈法师). And he got the dharma name "Chengpei" (乘培).

In 1951, You joined the Nanjing Song and Dance Troupe after high school. You entered Shanghai Theatre Academy in 1952, majoring in acting.

== Career ==
After graduating in 1956 he was assigned to the National Theatre Company of China as an actor.

You joined the Chinese Dramatists Association in 1980.

In 1984, You performed a famous pantomime named Shower (淋浴) in the annual CCTV New Year's Gala.

He first rose to prominence in 1986 for playing Ji Gong in the television series Ji Gong. The series reached number one in the ratings when it aired in China.

In 2009, You had a minor role as Tang Pangzi in The Butcher, the Chef and the Swordsman, which starred Masanobu Andō as Yaba.

You participated in many films, such as Reign of Assassins, The University Days of a Dog, and Painted Skin: The Resurrection.

In 1994, You founded the Beijing Benchang Movie & TV Cultural Co., Ltd.

On 28 July 2009, You became a monk at the Great Light Temple, in Suifenhe, Heilongjiang.

In 2021, he made a guest appearance as a Buddhist monk on the comedy film Lie Detector.

In 2023, Director Wong Kar-wai chose You for the part of Blossoms Shanghai, which enjoyed great popularity. You was praised for his performance as Ye Shu, A bao (Hu Ge)'s guide, mentor, and partner.

== Death ==
You died in Beijing on 24 September 2026, at the age of 93.

== Filmography ==
=== Film ===
Year	English title	Chinese title	Role	Notes
1984		下次开船 港游记	Yang Tieren	
1988	A Magic Doctor in Suzhou	姑苏一怪	Ye Tianshi	
1995	Fake Emperor	冒牌皇帝	Li Hongzhang	
2009	The Butcher, the Chef and the Swordsman	刀剑笑	Tang Pangzi	
2009	Ji Gong	济公3之古刹风云	Ji Gong	
2009	Ji Gong	济公3之茶亦有道	Ji Gong	
2009	Reign of Assassins	剑雨	Master Monk Xingchi	
2010	The University Days of a Dog	一只狗的大学时光	Grandpa	
2011	Lee's Adventures	李献计历险记	Li Xianji	
2011	Deadly flash play	致命闪玩	A gentleman	guest
2012	Cheer Up Mr Wan	老万加油	Laowan's boss	
2012	Painted Skin: The Resurrection	画皮2	Master	
2013	Blockbuster	大片	A patient	
2013	The Fox Lover	白狐	Master Shaye	
2013	The Wrath Of Vajra	金刚王	Master Yuanzu	
2021	Lie Detector	测谎人	Buddhist monk	

=== Television ===
Year	English title	Chinese title	Role	Notes
1985	Ji Gong	济公	Ji Gong	
1998		清明酒家	Private adviser	
1998	The Story of Liaofan	了凡的故事	Master Yunguhui	
1998		游先生哑然一笑		
2004	Not Without You	不能没有你		
2004	Lotus Lantern	宝莲灯	Daode Tianzun	
2011	New Era of the Police	新时代警察	An old overseas Chinese	
2022	Thank you Doctor	谢谢你医生		
2022	The Blood of Youth	少年歌行	Wang You	
2023	Blossoms Shanghai	繁花	Uncle Ye, or Yeshu (Yaso in Shanghainese)	

== Awards ==
Year	Work	Award	Result	Notes
1986	Ji Gong	Golden Eagle Award for Best Actor	Won	
2024		2nd China TV Drama Annual Ceremony – Lifetime Achievement Artist	Won	
2024		32nd China TV Golden Eagle Awards – Lifetime Achievement Award	Won	
