= 4th Golden Eagle Awards =

Chinese TV awards ceremony in 1986

The 4th Golden Eagle Awards were held May 9, 1986, in Fuzhou, Fujian province. Nominees and winners are listed below, winners are in bold.

== Best Television Series ==
not awarded this year

- New Star/新星
- Four Generations Under One Roof/四世同堂
- Finding the Returning World/寻找回来的世界

== Best Mini-series ==
not awarded this year

- Poor Street/穷街
- Men's Style/男人的风格
- Women and War/她们和战争
- A Woman Named Xu Xianshu/一个叫许淑娴的人

== Best Lead Actor in a Television Series ==
- **You Benchang for The Made Monk**

== Best Lead Actress in a Television Series ==
- **Li Weikang for Four Generations Under One Roof**

== Best Supporting Actor in a Television Series ==
- **Xu Jiajun for Finding the Returning World**

== Best Supporting Actress in a Television Series ==
- **Li Wanfen for Four Generations Under One Roof**

== Best Dubbing Actor ==
- **Da Shichang for Rose Strait**

== Best Dubbing Actress ==
- **Zhang Guilai for Father and Daughter**
