= Reaching Out (TV series) =

2001 Hong Kong television drama

- Official poster
- 美麗人生
- Genre: Drama
- Starring: Gordon Lam; Kenix Kwok; Benny Chan; Nicola Cheung; Michelle Ye; Ha Yu; Michelle Yim; Sammul Chan
- Theme music composer: Law Man-yu
- Opening theme: Beauty Defect (缺陷美) by Andy Lau
- Ending theme: How to Expose (怎暴露) by Nicola Cheung
- Composer: Nicola Cheung
- Country of origin: Hong Kong
- Original language: Cantonese
- No. of episodes: 45 (Hong Kong); 50 (Oversea)

Production
- Producer: Lee Tim-sing
- Production location: Hong Kong
- Camera setup: Multi camera
- Production company: TVB

Original release
- Network: TVB Jade
- Release: 5 February – 6 April 2001

Reaching Out
- Traditional Chinese: 美麗人生
- Simplified Chinese: 美丽人生
- Literal meaning: "Beautiful Life"
Transcriptions
Standard Mandarin
- Hanyu Pinyin: Měi Lì Rén Shēng
Yue: Cantonese
- Jyutping: Mei5 Lai6 Jan6 Sang1

Reaching Out is a 2001 Hong Kong television drama produced by TVB and starring Gordon Lam, Kenix Kwok, Benny Chan, Nicola Cheung and Michelle Ye. This series is Lam's last television role before leaving TVB and fully concentrating on his film career.

== Cast ==
=== Main cast ===
- Gordon Lam as Tai Fuk-sang (戴福生)
- Kenix Kwok as Yuk Hiu-kwan (郁曉君) / Claire Yuk (郁曉雅)
- Benny Chan as Stone Lau (劉二索)
- Nicola Cheung as Ko Wai-ting (高慧婷)
- Michelle Ye as Jess Wan (尹雪宜)
- Ha Yu as Lau Lik (劉力)
- Michelle Yim as Chan Kiu (陳嬌)
- Sammul Chan as Ken Kwok (郭啟邦)

=== Other cast ===
- Celia Sie as Vivian Ko (高慧雲)
- Chan Kwai-lam as Chan Ka-ming (陳家明)
- Bowie Wu as Kam Hon-to (甘翰韜)
- Yu Yeung as Kwok Wang-kei (郭宏基)
- Chan Ka Yee as Fong Yuk-ling (方玉玲)
- Wong Wai as Ko Siu-tong (高兆堂)
- Wai Ka Hung as Chin Chun (前進)
- Law Lan as Chow Yim-hung (周艷紅)
- Celine Ma as Lu Lu-kwan
- Yeung Ying Wai as Eric
- Lau Kong as Cho Sai-cheung (曹世昌)
- Pak Yan as Seung-koon Yuk (上官玉)
