= The Legend of Crazy Monk =

- Traditional Chinese: 活佛濟公
- Simplified Chinese: 活佛济公
- Hanyu Pinyin: Huófó Jì Gōng
- Genre: Ancient costume comedy
- Based on: Guo Xiaoting's Biography of Ji Gong
- Written by: Lin Tianyi
- Directed by: Lin Tianyi
- Starring: Benny Chan; Chen Zihan; Yan Kuan; Lam Chi-chung; Zhang Liang; Xinzi
- Opening theme: Song of Joy （快乐颂）
- Ending theme: Forgot It (忘了算了)
- Country of origin: China
- Original language: Mandarin
- No. of seasons: 4
- No. of episodes: 274

Production
- Executive producer: Wang Shiwei
- Production locations: Lingyin Temple, Hangzhou, Zhejiang
- Production companies: Shanghai Chongyuan Cultural Company; Hangzhou Baicheng Media Company

Original release
- Network: Guangdong Television/ Jiangsu Television
- Release: December 27, 2010 – January 25, 2011

Related
- The Enchanted; Entangled

The Legend of Crazy Monk (Chinese: 活佛济公) is a Chinese television series about the life of Ji Gong. The series was directed by Lin Tianyi and based on Guo Xiaoting's classical novel Biography of Ji Gong. It was a hot TV series recently in Guangdong Television, Jiangsu Television and Shenzhen Television. It is shown on Mediacorp Channel 8 at 7pm.

== Cast ==
- Benny Chan as Ji Gong / Li Xiuyuan / Daoji / Xianglong Luohan
- Ma Rui Han as Young Li Xiuyuan
- Lam Chi-chung as Guang Liang
- Chen Zihan as Yan Zhi
- Lin Jiangguo as Zhao Bin
- Xinzi as Bai Xue
- Yang Xue as Bai Ling
- Zhang Liang as Chen Liang
- Ye Zuxin as Bi Qing (seasons 2–3)
- Gao Hao as Bi Qing (season 1)
- Zhang Maojiong as monk Yuan Kong

=== Others ===
- Zhang Bao Wen as Lu Ji (Lizard Demon) (seasons 2–3)
- Leo Ding as Xiao Feng (Bat Demon) (season 3)
- Lou Ya Jiang as Hei Feng (Wolf Demon) (season 1) / Da Peng (Garuda / Buddha's Eagle) (season 3)

==== Season 1 ====
===== Story 1: Pregnant Man =====
- Candy Tu as Hong Xiuying
- He Xin as Qin Huan
- Wang Kuirong as Qin Xiang (Qin Huan's father)
- Cui Li Ming as Li Huai Chun (Genius Doctor)

===== Story 2: Blood Pearl =====
- Dong Xuan as Ming Zhu
- Yan Kuan as Sheng De
- Lou Yujian as Zhang Tianyuan

===== Story 3: Heart Digging =====
- Zheng Yitong as Hua Niang (Bailing's aunt)
- Chi Shuai as Cui Junsheng
- Zhang Meng as Xin Lan
- Zhang Lan as Mother Cui

===== Story 4 =====
- Lin Linlin as Mother Ghost

===== Story 5: Tianlei Newspaper =====
- Li Li as Zhou Wencong
- Ya Qi as Ru Ping
- Wang Gang as Businessman Zhou
- Wu Mian as Nai Niang
- Guan Shao Zeng as Tian Rui (imperial envoy; Wencong's biological father]

===== Story 6: Good Wife =====
- Li Jialin as Xu Yulian
- Gao Ziqi as Dong Zhongqing
- Wu Jing as Mother Dong
- Li Zhinan as Xu Yulong

===== Story 7: Rouge Tears =====
- He Minghan as Xu Zijing
- Zhang Gong as Garuda

==== Season 2 ====
===== Story 1 =====
- Timmy Hung as Xiao Yao
- Mu Tingting as Bing Lengxin
- Deng Tianqing as Leng Huazhi

===== Story 2 =====
- Tao Huimin as Shao Fang
- Yue Yueli as Liang Hua / Liang Bao
- Shi An as Lu Bang

===== Story 3 =====
- Du Xiaoting as Jiang Yuefeng
- Cui Lin as Lu Tianyu
- Yao Yichen as Yu Wulang

===== Story 4 =====
- Xu Xiyan as Li Menglan
- Chen Yizhen as Wawa

===== Story 5 =====
- Shirley Dai as Li Chunhe
- Deng Ziyi as Shang Yun
- Du Junze as Wen Zheng
- Suen Yiu Wai as Hong Chengzong

===== Story 6 =====
- Chunyu Shanshan as Liu Haotian
- Wang Xuanyu as Yelin
- Chen Jiajia as Zhu'er

===== Story 7 =====
- Wang Jiayin as Zhao Yuzhen
- Huang Mingsheng as Zhu Minghan
- Li Chenxi as Shi Xiuyun

===== Story 8 =====
- Yvonne Yung as Yu Linglong / snow girl
- Victor Chen Sze Hon as Gao Feng

===== Story 9 =====
- Kong Lin as Tong Yu Xia
- Jian Yuanxin as Xia Ziyuan

==== Season 3 ====
===== Story 1 =====
- Fann Wong as Xue Rou
- Han Xiao as Xue Yan
- Zhou Zhong as Prince of the Devils

===== Story 2 =====
- Liu Yajin as Bi Pan'an
- He Jiayi as Zhuang Hongxing
- Timmy Hung as Ao Zilong
- Zhou Zhixi as Qiu Tian'e
- Zhou Yunshen as Bi Panjin
- Dai Zixiang as Ye Qing
- Ye Ke'er as Yin Huan
- Wang Chunmei as Mother Zhuang
- Xue Shujie as Mother Bi
- Zheng Yanqi as Fang Hong
- Liu Xingling as Xiao Hongxing
- Wang Jiahui as Xiao Tian'e

===== Story 3 =====
- Bi Chang as Lin Honghua
- Jian Yuanxin as The Emperor of Song Dynasty
- Zhang Yongqi as Lin Xiuyun
- Zhang Mingming as Wu Tianliang
- Li Dongheng as Du Xian
- Li Qingning as Du Ying
- Fang Zhoubo as Wu Hou
- Hu Zhonghu as Wu Jin
- Xu Bao as Fang Bicheng
- Jin Youming as Father Lin
- Shi Xiaoju as Mother Lin

===== Story 4 =====
- Yang Xue as Bai Ling
- Zhang Liang as Qian Kun Dong Zhu, Chen Liang

===== Story 5 =====
- Wang Xiaoli as Ou Qingshan
- Li Jinrong as Kong Yulin
- Zheng Pengfei as Xie Jie
- Xiao Guangxu as Zuo Shan
- Liu Yuting as Luo Qiujuan
- Qi Qinglin as Kong Duan
- Yuan Min as Businessman Qian

===== Story 6 =====
- Candy Tu as Song Wanyi
- Gao Ren as A Lang
- Bao Wenjing as Xiaocui
- An Limin as Song Ke
- Xu Ming as Laoge

===== Story 7 =====
- Yao Yichen as Luo Mi'ou
- Qiao Qiao as Zhu Liyue
- Tang Yuan as Tang Yuan
- Zhu Weiying as Mother Luo
- Chen Liangping as Father Zhu
- Li Yiru as Qingqing
- Yan Hongding as Tudou

===== Story 8 =====
- Zhai Xingyue as Li Xingyue
- Shawn Wei as Li Menglong
- Mao Jianping as Mother Li
- Zhang Zhixi as Chou Tianhe

== Critical reception ==
The television series earned critical acclaim.

== See also ==
- Ji Gong, the main character in the series.
- Other media about Ji Gong:
  - Ji Gong (TV series), a 1985 Chinese television series starring You Benchang and Lü Liang
  - The Mad Monk, a 1993 Hong Kong film starring Stephen Chow
  - The Legends of Jigong, a 1997 Singaporean television series starring Xie Shaoguang
