= Eighteen Arhats =

Primary disciples of Gautama Buddha according to East Asian Buddhism

The Eighteen Arhats (or Eighteen Luohans) (Chinese: 十八羅漢; pinyin: Shíbā Luóhàn; Wade–Giles: Shih-pa Lo-han) are depicted in Chinese Buddhism as the original followers of Gautama Buddha (arhat) who have followed the Noble Eightfold Path and attained the four stages of enlightenment. They have reached the state of Nirvana and are free of worldly cravings. They are charged to protect the Buddhist faith and to wait on earth for the coming of Maitreya, an enlightened Buddha prophesied to arrive on earth many millennia after Gautama Buddha's death (parinirvana). In China, the eighteen arhats are also a popular subject in Buddhist art, such as the famous Chinese group of glazed pottery luohans from Yixian from about 1000 CE.

== In China ==
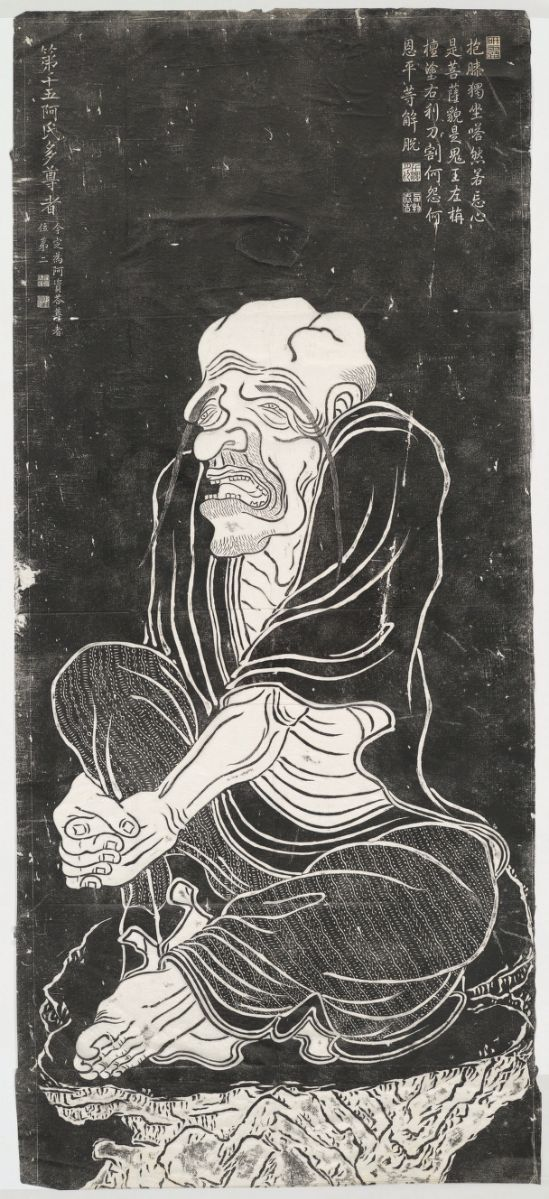
Ink rubbing of the stele commissioned by Qianlong depicting Asita. The upper right shows the inscriptions of the eulogy given by Qianlong.

Originally, the arhats were composed of only 10 disciples of Gautama Buddha, although the earliest Indian sutras indicate that only 4 of them, Pindola, Kundadhana, Panthaka and Nakula, were instructed to await the coming of Maitreya. Earliest Chinese representations of the arhats can be traced back to as early as the fourth century, and mainly focused on Pindola who was popularized in art by the book Method for Inviting Pindola (Chinese: 請賓度羅法; pinyin: Qǐng Bīndùluó Fǎ).

Later this number increased to sixteen to include patriarchs and other spiritual adepts. Teachings about the Arhats eventually made their way to China where they were called Luohan (羅漢, shortened from a-luo-han a Chinese transcription for Arhat), but it wasn't until 654 AD when the Nandimitrāvadāna (Chinese: 法住記; pinyin: Fǎzhùjì), Record on the Duration of the Law, spoken by the Great arhat Nadimitra, was translated by Xuanzang into Chinese that the names of these arhats were known. For some reason Kundadhana was dropped from this list.

Somewhere between the late Tang dynasty and early Five Dynasties and Ten Kingdoms period of China two other Luohans were added to the roster increasing the number to 18. But this depiction of 18 Luohans only gained a foothold in China, whereas other areas like Japan continued to revere only sixteen and their roster differs somewhat. This depiction of having 18 instead of 16 Luohans continues into modern Chinese Buddhist traditions. A cult built around the Luohans as guardians of Buddhist faith gained momentum amongst Chinese Buddhists at the end of the ninth century for they had just been through a period a great persecution under the reign of Emperor Tang Wuzong. In fact the last two additions to this roster, Taming Dragon and Taming Tiger, are thinly veiled swipes against Taoism.

== In Chinese art ==
Because no historical records detailing what the Luohans looked like existed, there were no distinguishing features to tell the Luohans apart in early Chinese depictions. The first portraits of the 16 Luohans were painted by the monk Guanxiu in 891 AD, who at the time was residing in Chengdu. Legend has it that the 16 Luohans knew of Guanxiu's expert calligraphy and painting skills, so they appeared to the monk in a dream to make a request that he paint their portraits. The paintings depicted them as foreigners having bushy eyebrows, large eyes, hanging cheeks and high noses. They were seated in landscapes, leaning against pine trees and stones. An additional theme in these paintings was that they were portrayed as being unkempt and "eccentric," which emphasizes that they were vagabonds and beggars who have left all worldly desires behind. When Guanxiu was asked how he came up with the depictions, he answered: "It was in a dream that I saw these Gods and Buddhas. After I woke up, I painted what I saw in the dream. So, I guess I can refer to these Luohans as 'Luohans in a dream'." These portraits painted by Guanxiu have become the definitive images for the 18 Luohans in Chinese Buddhist iconography, although in modern depictions they bear more Sinitic features and at the same time have lost their exaggerated foreign features in exchange for more exaggerated expressions. The paintings were donated by Guanxiu to the Shengyin Temple in Qiantang (present day Hangzhou) where they are preserved with great care and ceremonious respect. Many prominent artists such as Wu Bin and Ding Guanpeng would later try to faithfully imitate the original paintings.

The Qianlong Emperor was a great admirer of the Luohans and during his visit to see the paintings in 1757, Qianlong not only examined them closely but he also wrote a eulogy to each Luohan image. Copies of these eulogies were presented to the monastery and preserved. In 1764, Qianlong ordered that the paintings held at the Shengyin Monastery be reproduced and engraved on stone tablets for preservation. These were mounted like facets on a marble stupa for public display. The temple was destroyed during the Taiping Rebellion but copies of ink rubbings of the steles were preserved in and outside of China.

== Roster ==
In the Chinese tradition, the 18 Luohans are generally presented in the order they are said to have appeared to Guan Xiu, not according to their power: Deer Sitting, Happy, Raised Bowl, Raised Pagoda, Meditating, Oversea, Elephant Riding, Laughing Lion, Open Heart, Raised Hand, Thinking, Scratched Ear, Calico Bag, Plantain, Long Eyebrow, Doorman, Taming Dragon and Taming Tiger.

Although the roster varies by region, this is the generally accepted listing.

| Name | Qianlong's Eulogy | Synopsis |
|---|---|---|
| 01. Pindola Bharadvaja*; (Sanskrit: Pindolabharadrāja) (Chinese: 賓度羅跋羅墮闍尊者; pinyin: Bīndùluó Báluóduòshé Zūnzhě) | Sitting dignified on a deer, As if in deep thought. With perfect composure, Contented with being above worldly pursuits. | Guan Xiu's Dream: Deer Sitting Luohan (Chinese: 騎鹿羅漢; pinyin: Qílù Luóhàn) |
| 02. Kanaka the Vatsa; (Sanskrit: Kanakavatsa) (Chinese: 迦諾迦伐蹉尊者; pinyin: Jiānuòjiā Fácuō Zūnzhě) | Decimating the demons, The universe now cleared. Hands raised for jubilation, Be wild with joy. | Happy Luohan (Chinese: 喜慶羅漢; pinyin: Xǐqìng Luóhàn) |
| 03. Kanaka the Bharadvaja; (Sanskrit: Kanakabharadrāja) (Chinese: 迦諾迦跋釐堕闍尊者; pinyin: Jiānuòjiā Bálíduòshé Zūnzhě) | In majestic grandeur, Joy descends from heaven. Raised the bowl to receive happiness, Glowing with jubilance and exultation. | Raised Bowl Luohan (Chinese: 舉缽羅漢; pinyin: Jǔbō Luóhàn) |
| 04. Subhadra; (Sanskrit: Shubinda ) (Chinese: 蘇頻陀尊者; pinyin: Sūpíntuó Zūnzhě) | A seven-storey pagoda, Miraculous power of the Buddha. Forceful without being angry, With preeminent Buddhist might. | Raised Pagoda Luohan (Chinese: 托塔羅漢; pinyin: Tuōda Luóhàn) |
| 05. Nakula*; (Sanskrit: Nakula/Vakula) (Chinese: 諾距羅尊者; pinyin: Nuòjùluó Zūnzhě) | Quietly cultivating the mind, A countenance calm and composed. Serene and dignified, To enter the Western Paradise. | Meditating Lohan (Chinese: 靜座羅漢; pinyin: Jìngzuò Luóhàn) |
| 06. Bhadra/Bodhidharma; (Chinese: 跋陀羅尊者; pinyin: Bátuóluó Zūnzhě) | Bearing the sutras, Sail east to spread the world. Climbing mountains and fording streams, For the deliverance of the humanity. | Overseas Lohan (Chinese: 過江羅漢; pinyin: Guojiāng Luóhàn) |
| 07. Kalika; (Sanskrit: Kālika) (Chinese: 迦理迦尊者; pinyin: Jiālǐjiā Zūnzhě) | Riding an elephant with a dignified air, Chanting aloud the sutras. With a heart for the humanity, Eyes scanning the four corners of the universe. | Elephant Riding Lohan (Chinese: 騎象羅漢; pinyin: Qíxiàng Luóhàn) |
| 08. Vajraputra; (Chinese: 伐闍羅弗多尊者; pinyin: Fáshéluófúduō Zūnzhě) | Playful and free of inhibitions, The lion cub leaps with joy. Easily alternating tension with relaxation, Rejoicing with all living things. | Laughing Lion Lohan (Chinese: 笑獅羅漢; pinyin: Xiàoshī Luóhàn) |
| 09. Gobaka; (Chinese: 戌博迦尊者; pinyin: Xūbójiā Zūnzhě) | Open the heart and there is Buddha, Each displaying his prowess. The two should not compete, For Buddha's power is boundless. | Open Heart Lohan (Chinese: 開心羅漢; pinyin: Kāixīn Luóhàn) |
| 10. Panthaka/ Pantha the Elder, Long Armed Arhat *; (Chinese: 半托迦尊者; pinyin: Bàntuōjiā Zūnzhě) | Easy and comfortable, Yawning and stretching. In a state of omniscience, Contented with his own lot. | Raised Hand Lohan (Chinese: 探手羅漢; pinyin: Tànshǒu Luóhàn) |
| 11. Rahula; (Sanskrit: Rāhula) (Chinese: 羅怙羅尊者; pinyin: Luóhùluó Zūnzhě) | Pondering and meditating, Understanding it all. Above this world and free from conventions, Compassion conveyed up to the Ninth Heaven | Thinking Lohan (Chinese: 沉思羅漢; pinyin: Chénsi Luóhàn) |
| 12. Nagasena; (Sanskrit: Nāgasena) (Chinese: 那迦犀那尊者; pinyin: Nājiāxīnā Zūnzhě) | Leisurely and contented, Happy and knowledgeable. Full of wit and humour, Exuberant with interest. | Scratch Ear Lohan (Chinese: 挖耳羅漢; pinyin: Wāěr Luóhàn) |
| 13. Angida; (Sanskrit: Ingata) (Chinese: 因揭陀尊者; pinyin: Yīnjiētuó Zūnzhě) | Buddha of infinite life, Valuable bag containing secrets of heaven and earth. Happy and contented, Cheerful and joyful is he. | Calico Bag Lohan (Chinese: 布袋羅漢; pinyin: Bùdài Luóhàn) |
| 14. Vanavasa; (Sanskrit: Vanavāsa) (Chinese: 伐那婆斯尊者; pinyin: Fánāpósī Zūnzhě) | Carefree and leisurely, Disdainfully regards the Great Void. With celestial airs and religious spirit, Transcending this mortal world. | Plantain Lohan (Chinese: 芭蕉羅漢; pinyin: Bājiāo Luóhàn) |
| 15. Ajita/ Asita; (Chinese: 阿氏多尊者; pinyin: āshìduō Zūnzhě) | Compassionate elder, A monk who has attained enlightenment. Perceptive of the infinite universe, With tacit understanding. | Long Eyebrow Lohan (Chinese: 长眉羅漢; pinyin: Chángméi Luóhàn) |
| 16. Chota-panthaka /Pantha the Younger; (Sanskrit: Cūḍapanthaka) (Chinese: 注茶半托迦尊者; pinyin: Zhùchá Bàntuōjiā Zūnzhě) | Powerful, husky and tough, Watching with careful alertness. With the Buddhist staff in hand. Valiantly annihilates the evil. | Doorman Lohan (Chinese: 看門羅漢; pinyin: Kānmén Luóhàn) |
| 17. Mahākāśyapa+; (Chinese: 嘎沙鴉巴尊者; pinyin: Gāshāyābā Zūnzhě) Kassapa/ Nandimitra/ the Arhat of Many Mysteries (Chinese: 难提密; pinyin: Nántí-mì) (Chinese:难提密多; pinyin: Nántí-mìduō) (Chinese: 嘎沙鸦巴; pinyin: Gāshā-yābā) (Chinese:庆友; pinyin: Qìngyǒu) (Chinese:摩诃迦叶; pinyin: Mó hē jiā yè) | In the hands are the spiritual pearl and the holy bowl, Endowed with power that knows no bounds. Full of valour, vigour and awe-inspiring dignity, To succeed in vanquishing the ferocious dragon. | Taming Dragon Lohan (Chinese: 降龍羅漢; pinyin: Jiánglóng Luóhàn) |
| 18. Bintoulu/Nàdá-mìdá-lǎ +; (Chinese: 纳答密答喇尊者; pinyin: Nàdámìdálǎ Zūnzhě) | Precious ring with magical powers, Infinitely resourceful. Vigorous and powerful, Subduing a ferocious tiger. | Taming Tiger Lohan (Chinese: 伏虎羅漢; pinyin: Fúhǔ Luóhàn) |

== Gallery ==
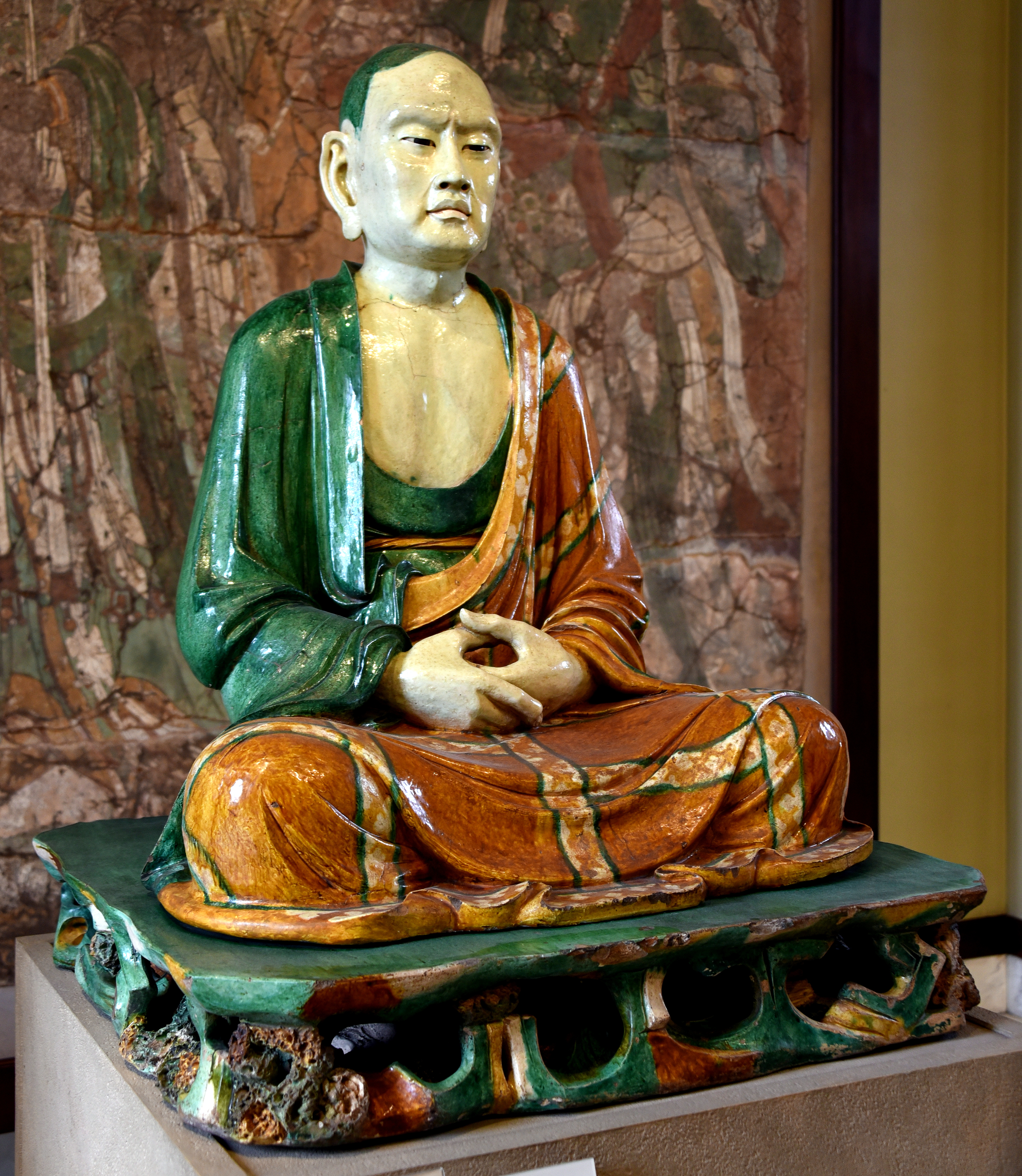
Stoneware figure of a luohan, from Yixian, China, Liao dynasty, 907–1125 CE. British Museum

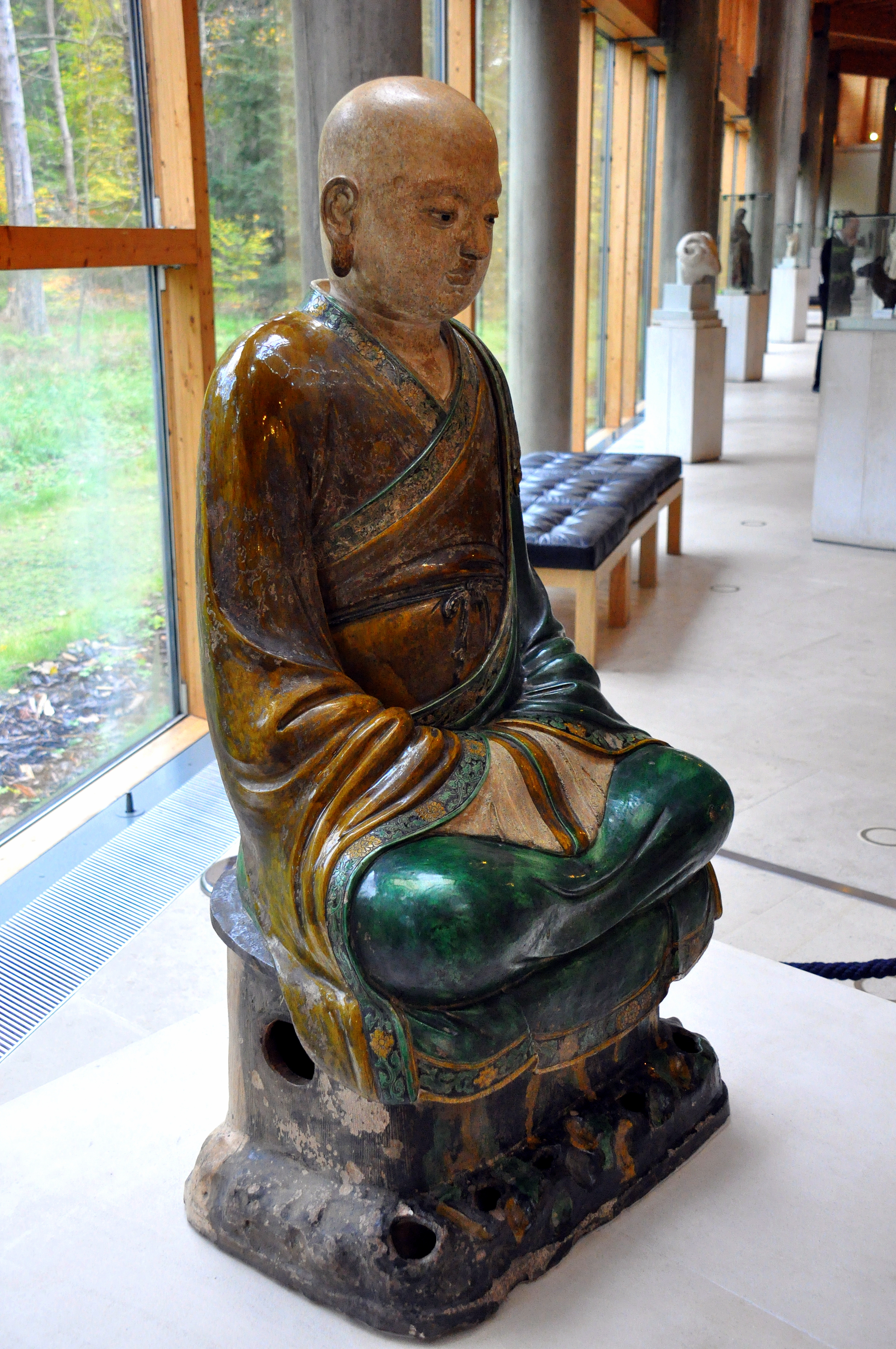
Stoneware statue of a luohan, Ming dynasty, 15th century CE, from China. The Burrell Collection, UK

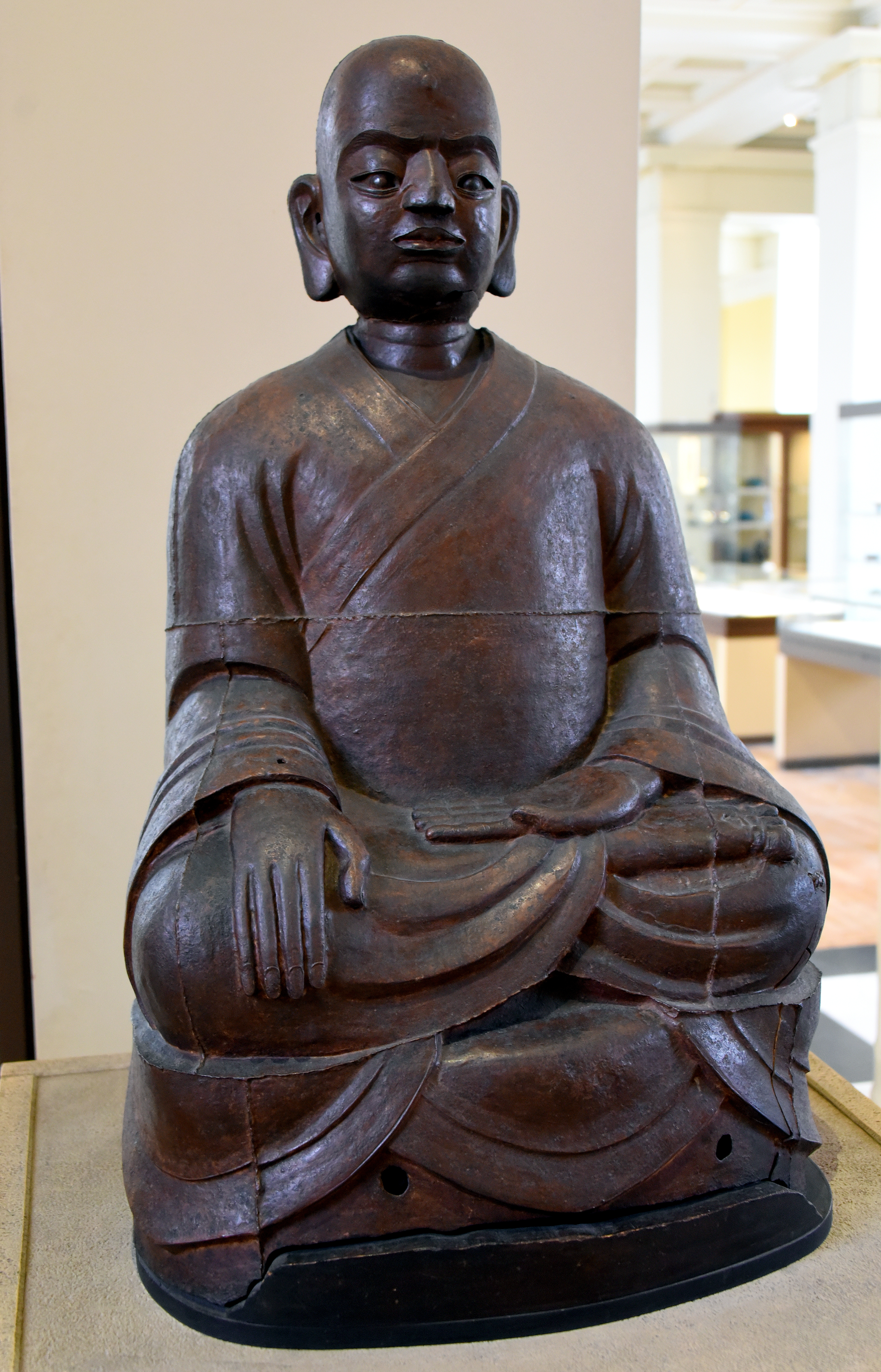
Iron figure of a luohan, from China, Ming dynasty, 1494 CE, the British Museum

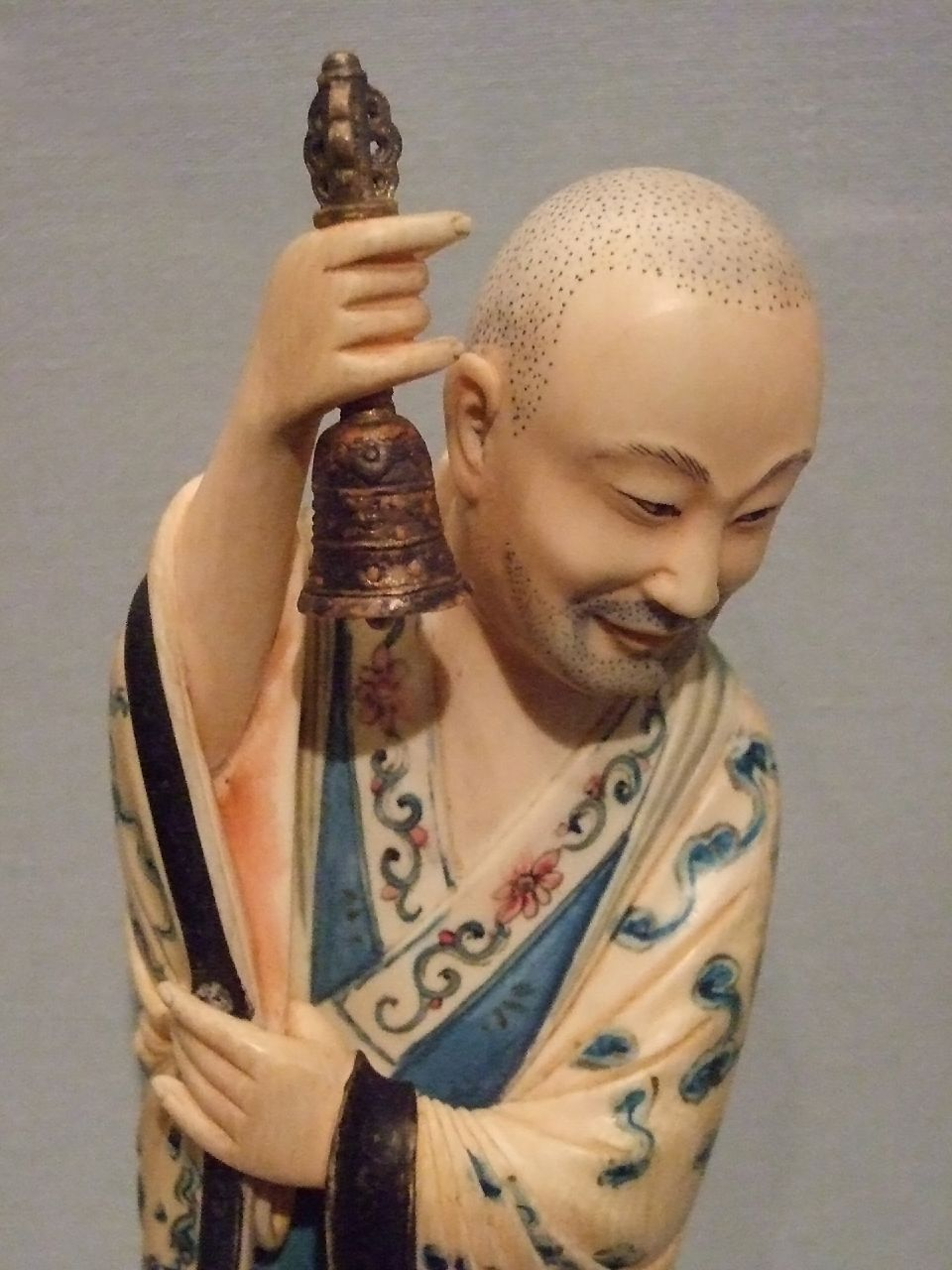
