= Jingci Temple =

Buddhist temple in Hangzhou, China

- 净慈寺
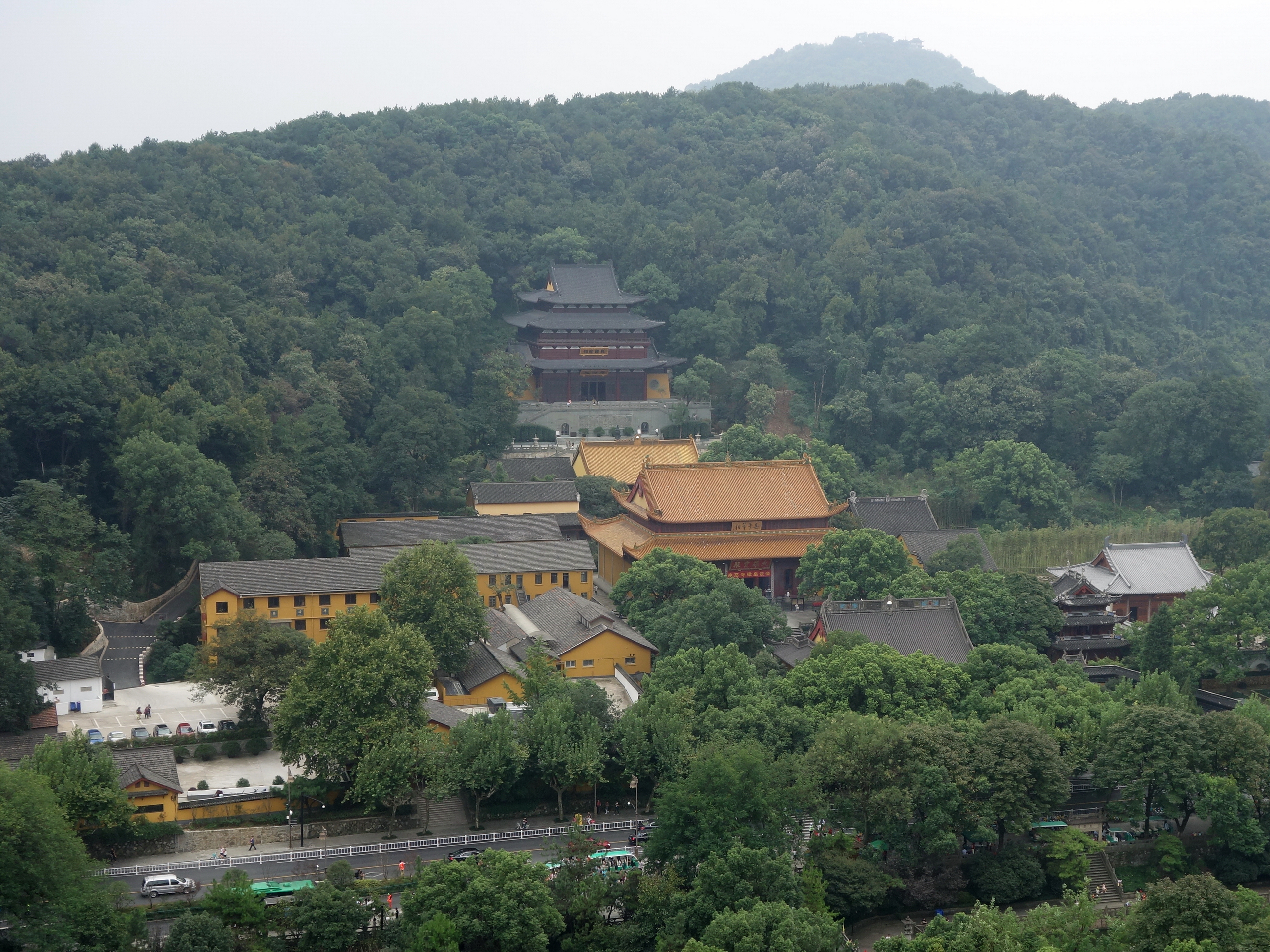
- Jingci Temple

- Location within Zhejiang

Religion
- Affiliation: Buddhism
- Sect: Chan Buddhism

Location
- Location: Xihu District, Hangzhou, Zhejiang, China
- Coordinates: 30°13′46″N 120°08′56″E

Architecture
- Style: Chinese architecture
- Founder: Qian Chu
- Established: 954

Jingci Temple (simplified Chinese: 净慈寺; traditional Chinese: 淨慈寺; pinyin: Jìngcí Sì) is located at the foot of Huiri Peak of Nanping Hill. It is the second prominent Buddhist temple beside West Lake in Hangzhou, China. Together with Lingyin Temple, it is called the jewel of the southern and northern hills. The temple was claimed as a key national Buddhist temple in Han areas by the State Council in 1983.

The temple is situated on the western shore of West Lake, a UNESCO World Heritage Site. The temple's main hall houses a statue of Sakyamuni Buddha and is surrounded by beautiful gardens and pavilions. Jingci Temple is an important cultural and religious site in China and attracts many visitors each year.

== History ==
Jingci Temple was originally called Huiri Yongming Temple (慧日永明院). It was first built in 954 by King Qian Chu of the Wuyue kingdom for a famous monk Yongming Yanshou. In the Southern Song dynasty, its name was changed to Jingci Temple, and the "500 Luohan Hall" was built. The temple was destroyed and rebuilt several times in the history. The current building of the temple was built in the 1980s. Specially, there is a newly forged copper bell in 1984 with the assistance of Eihei-ji, one of the head temple of Soto Zen Buddhism. The bell is to replace the original one that was forged in Hongwu period of Ming dynasty and went missing during late Qing period. It is weighing over 100 kilograms and is carved The Lotus Sutra (妙法莲花经), with 68,000 characters.

It hosts one of Ten Scenes of West Lake, "Evening Bell Ringing at the Nanping Hill" (南屏晚钟).

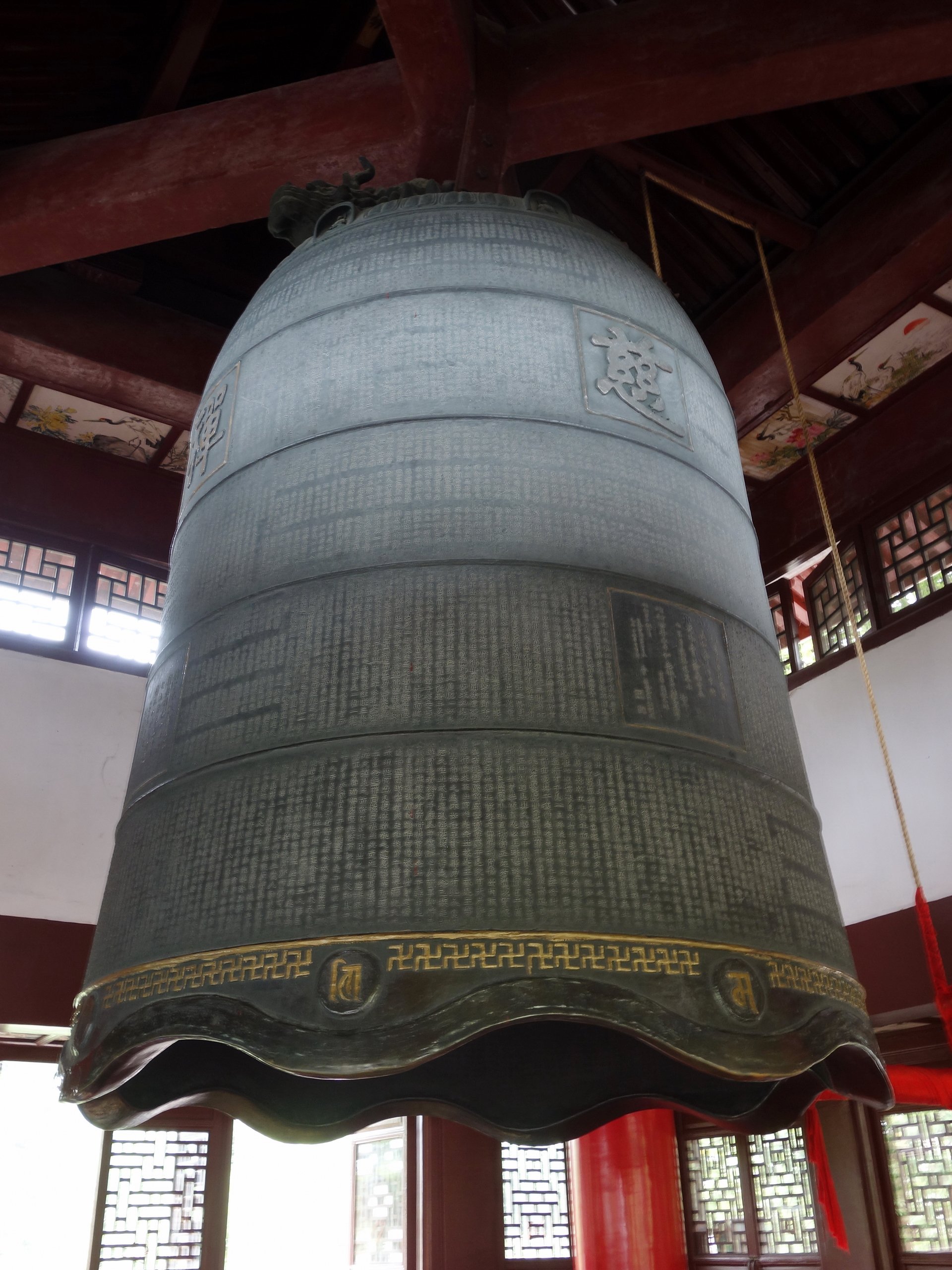
New Bell in Jingci Temple that inscripted with Lotus Sutra
