= Yajin =

Chinese clothing lapel accessory

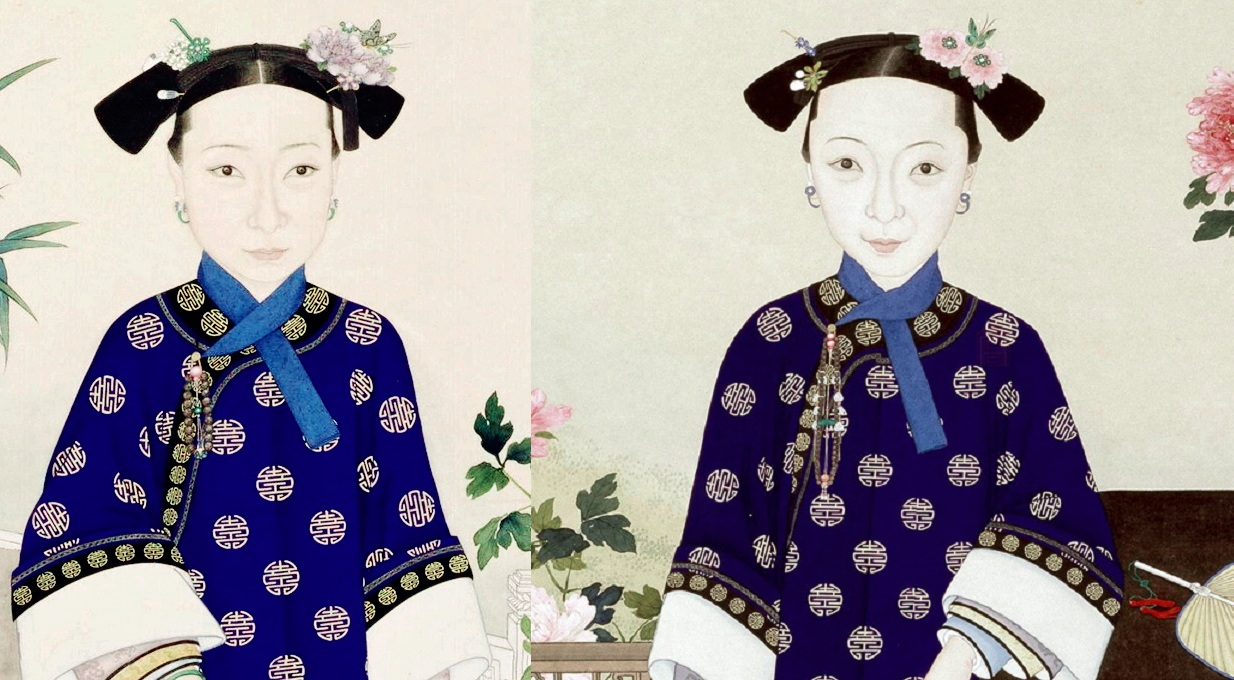
- Empress Dowager Ci'an wearing 2 variants of shibazi-style yanji (the right painting basically having double the beads compared to the left painting)
- Traditional Chinese: 壓襟
- Simplified Chinese: 压襟
- Literal meaning: Press lapel
Transcriptions
Standard Mandarin
- Hanyu Pinyin: Yājīn

Second alternative Chinese name
- Chinese: 事件儿
Transcriptions

Yajin (simplified Chinese: 压襟; traditional Chinese: 壓襟; pinyin: Yājīn), also known as shijian er (Chinese: 事件儿; pinyin: Shìjiàn er), is a type of Chinese accessory which is placed at the lapels of Chinese clothing (robes and jackets); they would typically hanged down on the right side (sometimes at the front depending on the clothing closure) of the chest area in order to press on the clothing. The yajin appeared as early as the Tang dynasty and became popular in the Ming and Qing dynasties. There are various styles of yajin, including a dangling pendant-style (which is similar to jinbu or tassels in style) and a bracelet-style, known as shibazi (Chinese: 十八子; pinyin: Shíbāzi; lit. 'Eighteen sons'). Yajin can also be used as accessories on the cheongsam, where it is tied on the pankou knots.

== Construction and design ==
=== Pendant-style yajin ===
The pendant-style yajin may consist of string of beads, metal chains, and pendants (including precious stones, yupei-like materials, or metal filigree) which comes in various shapes such as flowers, animals, and auspicious motifs/ themes/ Chinese characters. It may also include tassels. In the late Qing, people sometimes used old silver coins to make their yajin.

In Qing dynasty, Han Chinese women also wore pendant-like charms made of diverse materials (such as jade, amber, gold) at the top button on the side of their ao jackets. They also wore other forms of pendants, such as pendants made of metal filigree in the shape of potpourri container which would be filled with fragrant herbs and long silver pendants with small silver charms which were filled with bells which would frightened evil spirits away when they tickled as they wore. They would also hang purses on the top button of their jacket.

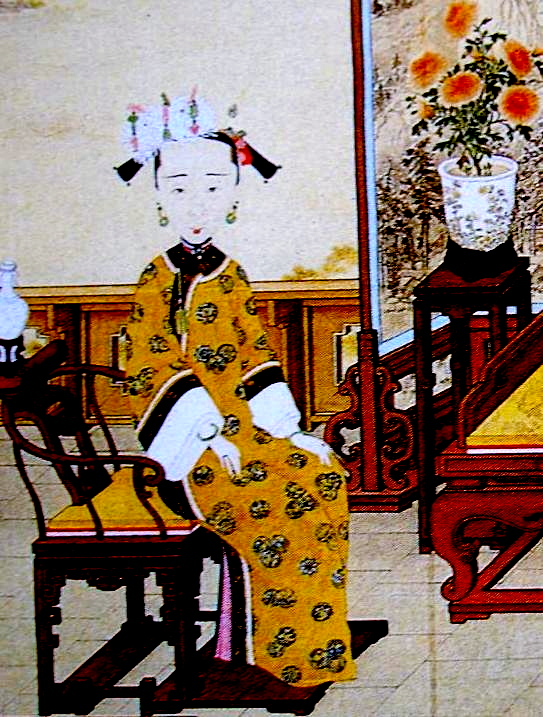
Empress Xiaoquancheng

=== Shibazi-style yajin ===
A shibazi is a type of 18-beads bracelet which originated from the japamala and could also be used as a form of yajin. Shibazi sometimes have hanging buckles; they would be hung on the right lapels of the clothing or could be worn around the wrist like a regular bracelet. There were no strict regulations on its wearing etiquette.

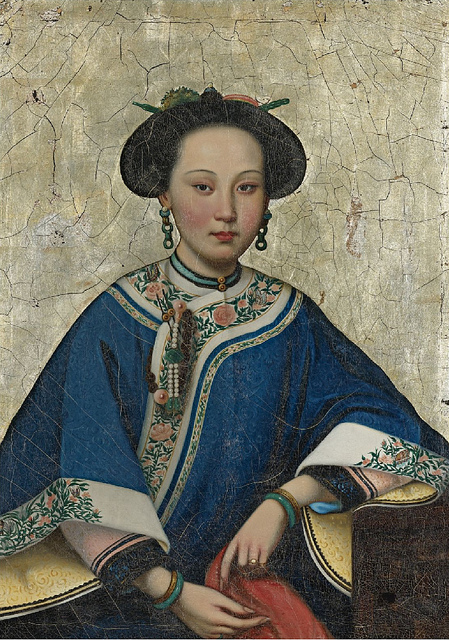
Fragrant Concubine (after Giuseppe Castiglione)

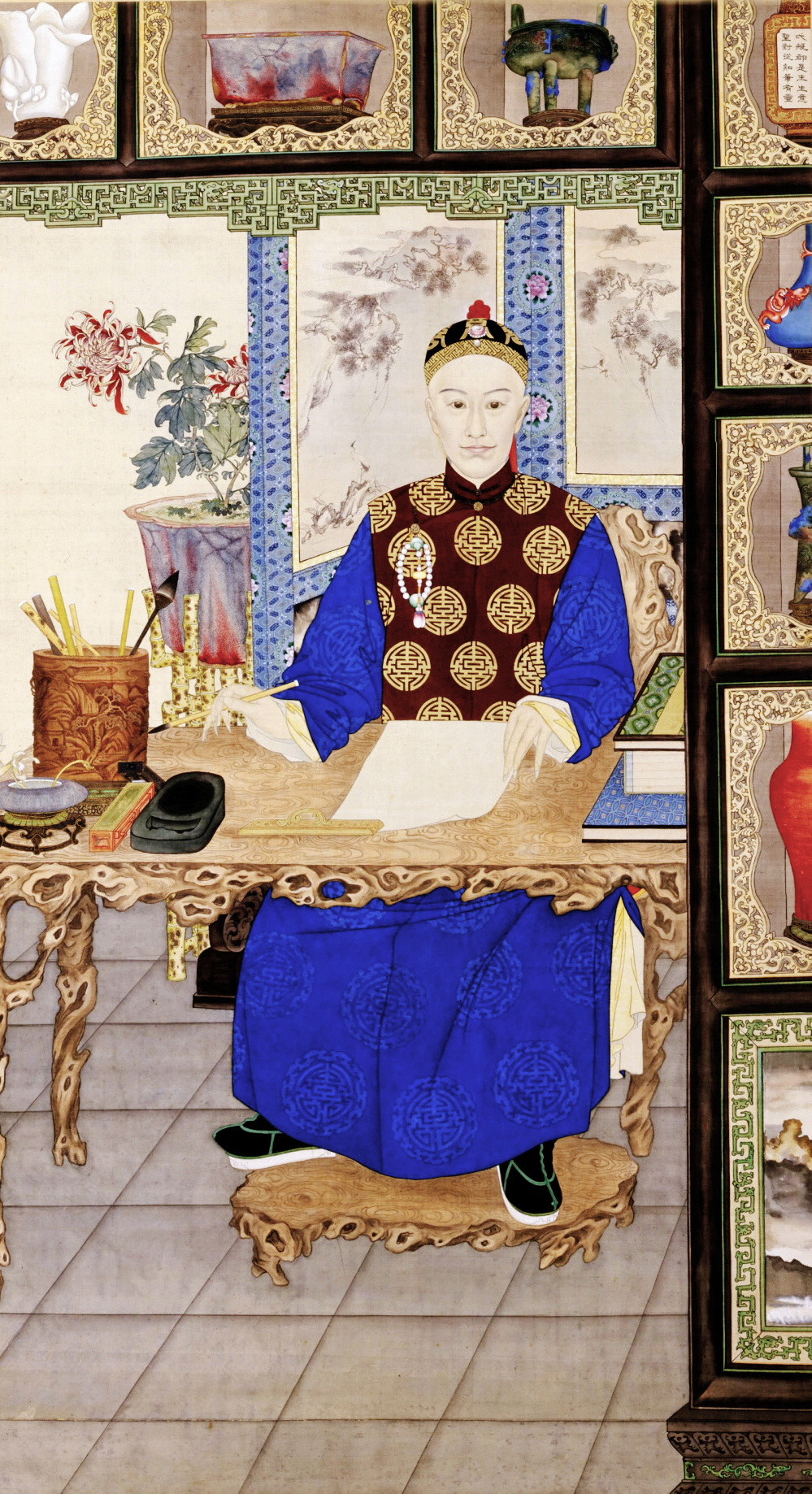
Guangxu Emperor in informal robes

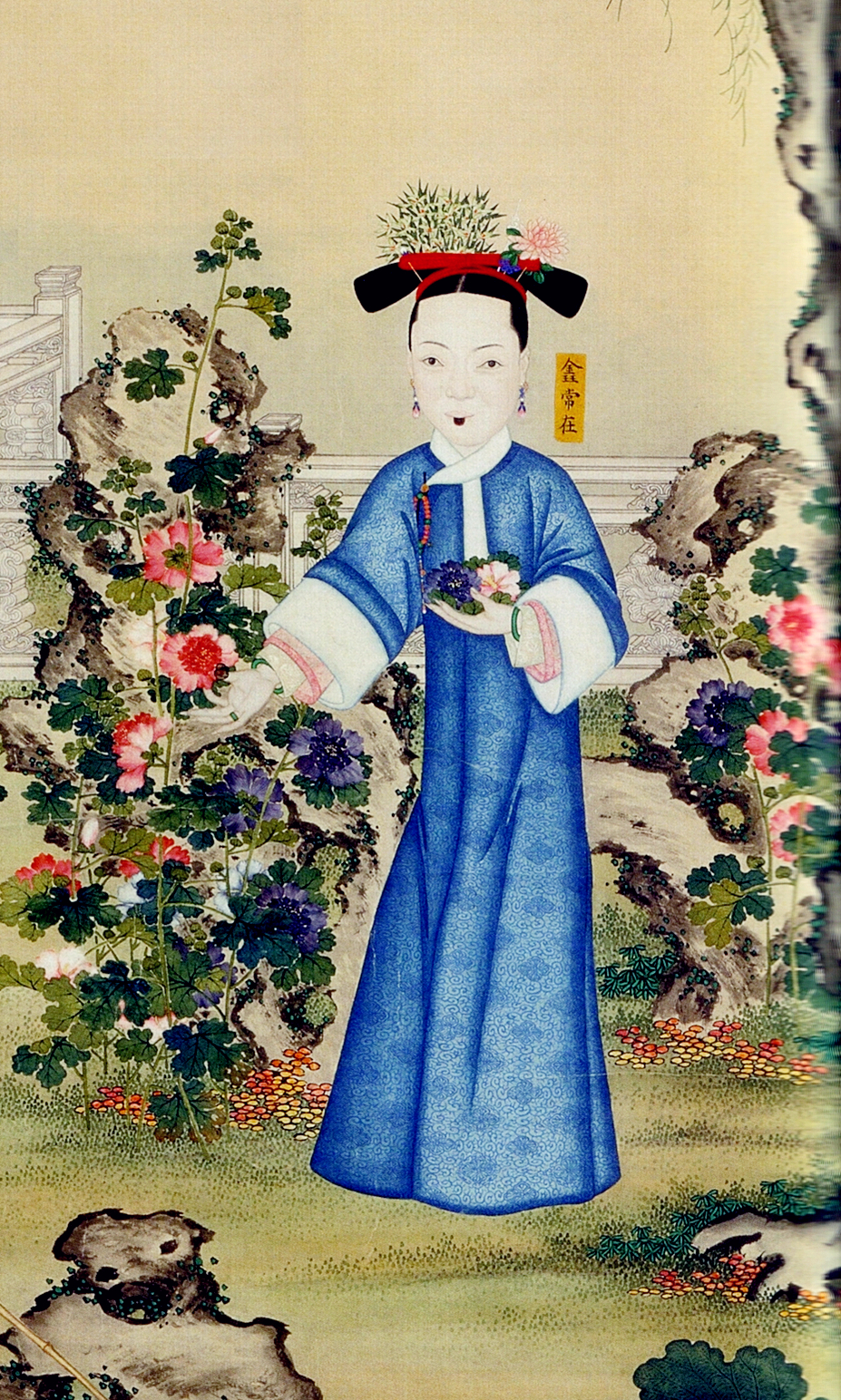
First Class Female Attendant Xin

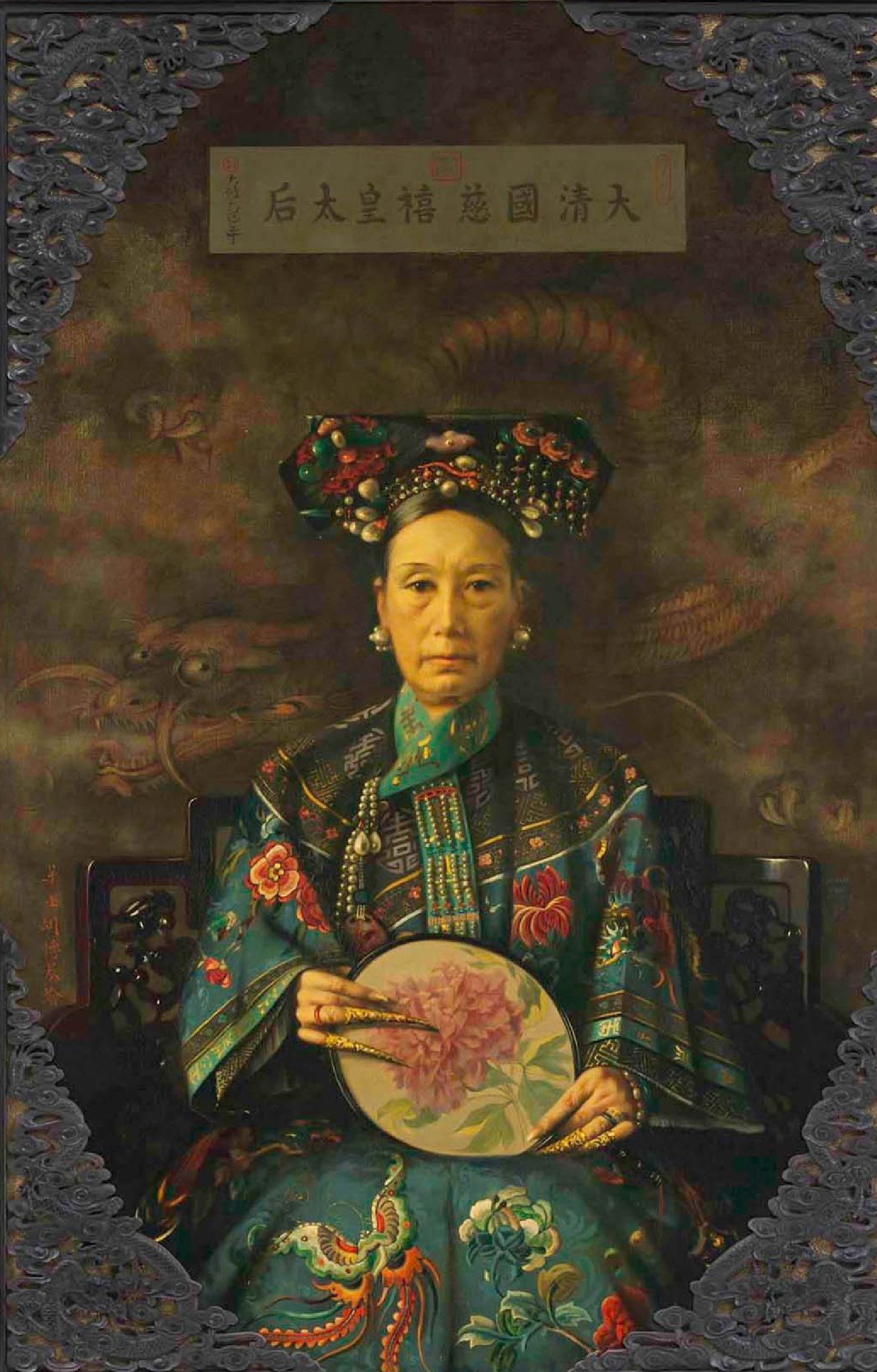
Empress Dowager Cixi by Hubert Vos

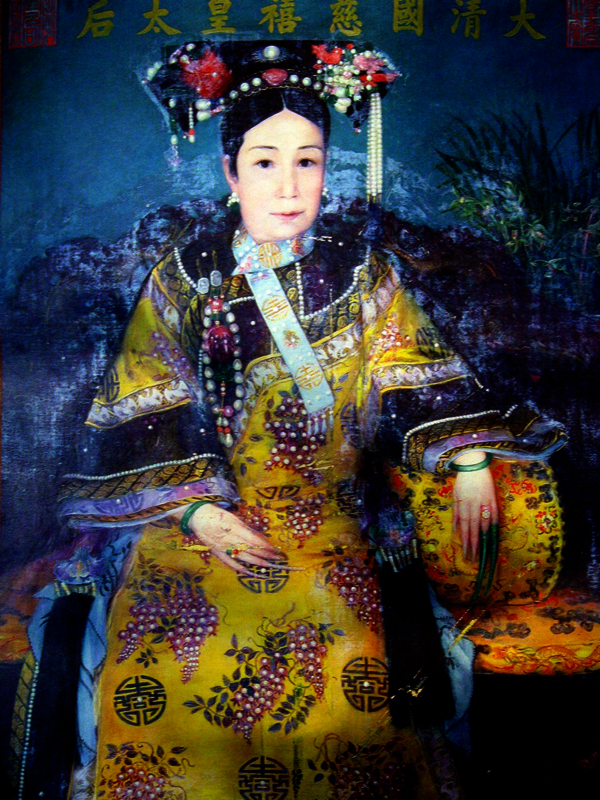
Empress Dowager Cixi by Katharine Carl

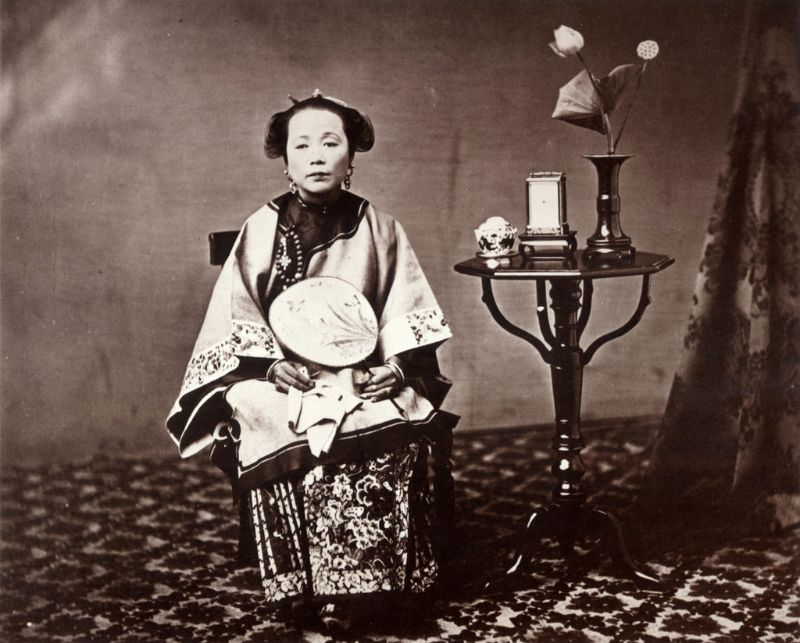
A Cantonese lady wearing shibazi-style yajin on her ao jacket, 1861–1864

== Depictions and media ==
Yajin are sometimes depicted in Chinese television drama, especially Qing dynasty Court drama:

- Nothing Gold Can Stay (2017)
- Ruyi's Royal Love in the Palace (2018)
- Story of Yanxi Palace (2018)

== Similar items ==
- Jinbu - A Chinese waist accessory used to press clothing down; it is an ensemble of yupei (jade pendants)
- Norigae - a Korean clothing accessory

== See also ==
- Qizhuang
- Ruqun
- Chaozhu (Court necklace)
- Longhua (collar)
- Hanfu accessories
