= Longhua =

Longhua may refer to:

== Places in China ==
- Longhua, Chongqing, Jiangjin, Chongqing
- Longhua, Xianyou County, Fujian
- Longhua, Shenzhen, Guangdong
  - Longhua Subdistrict, Shenzhen (龙华街道)
- Longhua, Boluo County, Boluo County, Guangdong
- Longhua, Longmen County, Longmen County, Guangdong
- Longhua, Haikou, Hainan
- Longhua County, and Longhua Town, Hebei
- Longhua, Jing County, Hebei, Jing County, Hebei
- Longhua, Yicheng County, Yicheng County, Shanxi
- Longhua Subdistrict, Shanghai, Xuhui, Shanghai

== Other uses ==
- Longhua (collar), a Qing dynasty garment

== See also ==
- Longhua Temple, in Shanghai
