= Norigae =

Traditional Korean accessory for hanbok

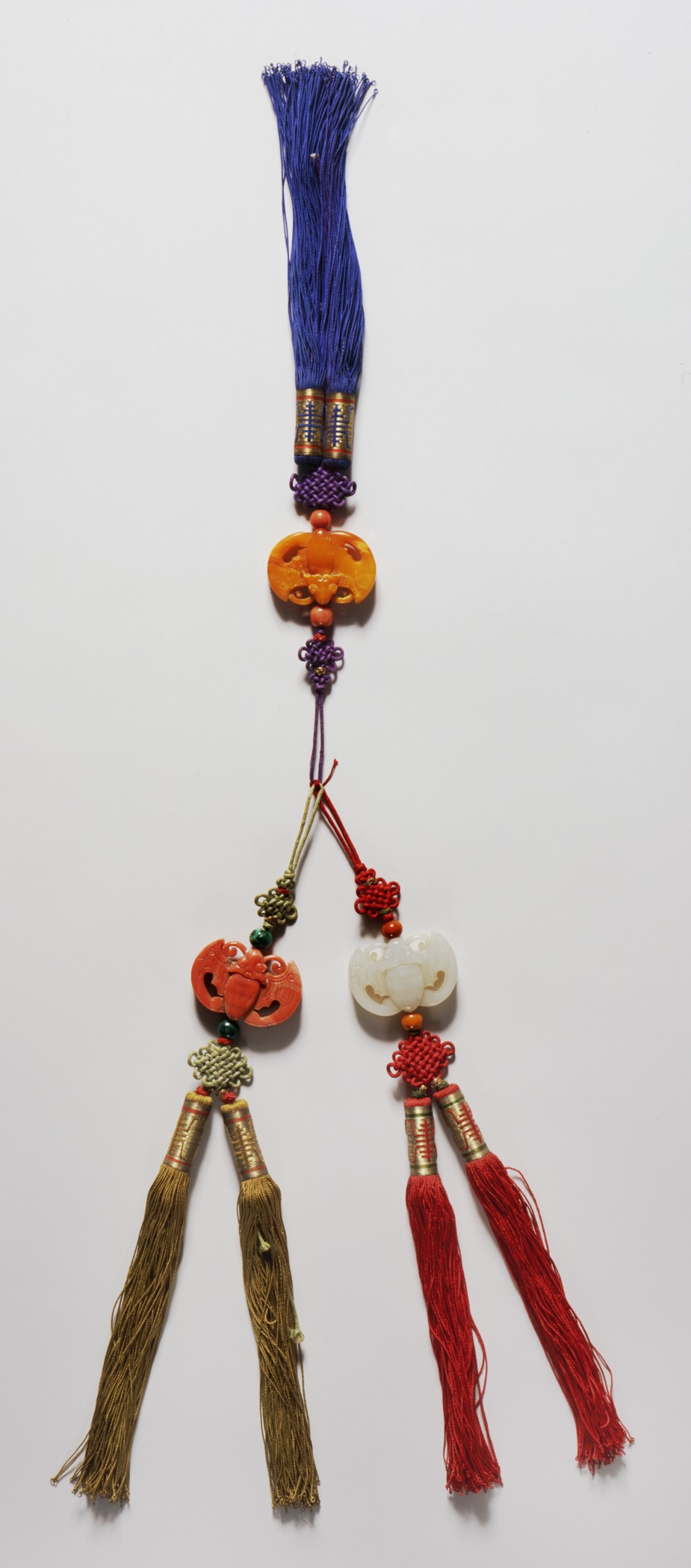
- Three parts norigae with bat ornaments

Korean name
- Hangul: 노리개
- RR: norigae
- MR: norigae

Norigae (Korean: 노리개) is a typical, traditional Korean accessory used in Hanbok, which can be hung on goreum (coat strings) of a woman's jeogori or on her chima. The norigae functions as a decorative pendant and is both a good-luck charm hoped to bring something such as eternal youth, wealth or many sons (depending on its shape), as well as a fashion accessory. Usually, the norigae from the parents' or in-laws' home was passed down to descendants.

== Terminology ==
The word norigae originally referred to "pretty and playful objects" or "favourite trinkets" signifying women's liking for the tassel charm regardless of social ranks.

== History ==
=== Origins ===
The exact origins of the norigae are unknown, but the current knotting tassel known as norigae can be traced back to the Joseon dynasty and was an item worn exclusively by the Joseon. It is also difficult to pinpoint the exact time when the norigae started to be widely used.

Some sources state that the norigae might have been a protective emblem called jema used in primitive shamanism and was worn initially by children. However, the true archetype of norigae appears to be the waist pendant worn in the Silla period.

=== Joseon ===
In Joseon, all women of different classes wore the norigae from queens to commoners. The norigae also served to distinguish social ranks and social status. Different shapes and sizes signified the different occasions the norigae was worn to as well as which season to wear it in. The norigae could also be used as a chest or a waist decorations.

== Composition ==
The norigae is composed by three basic parts: the main ornament, elaborate knots, the tassel on the lowest part. A norigae can be divided into 4 parts: the ttidon (Korean: 띠돈) which is a hook (either a separate accessory or additional knots) to attach the norigae to the Hanbok, the paemul (Korean: 패물) which is the main ornament of the norigae, the maedeup (Korean: 매듭) which are the knots of the norigae, and the sul (Korean: 술) which are the tassels.

The norigae can be categorize to sizes, large, medium and small according to the person who wears the norigae or places at. For example, the norigae for infant will be much smaller one than adult's. In Joseon Dynasty, the King Yeonsangun used the luxuriousness and sizes of norigae to classify the social rank of his women.

The norigae have various shapes derived from nature or from everyday life. They are divided into samjaks (Korean: 삼작; Hanja: 三作) and danjaks (Korean: 단작; Hanja: 單作). The samjaks can be further divided into the daesamjaks and the sosamjaks. Both the daesamjaks and the sosamjaks have the same form, but each one's paemul is different.

=== Main Ornament ===
The main ornament, paemul, for making norigae is usually using gold, silver, jewels, and precious stone.

The motifs of main ornament are cut down into 5 basic branches, such as animal, plants, daily objects, characters, and religious symbols. For example, some auspicious characters include the Chinese character, shou 《壽》 which represents longevity. The religious symbols are typically motifs that represents Buddhism.

=== Knots ===
The maedup uses coloured cord to braid into various shapes. The type of knot has to follow the design of main ornament. The big size of the main ornament parts will combine with small knots. The small main ornament comes along with large knots. The types of knots have to match the whole weight the norigae is going to be.

=== Tassel ===
The sul, which are tassels, are made out of colored silk thread and placed at the lower parts.

=== Ttidon ===
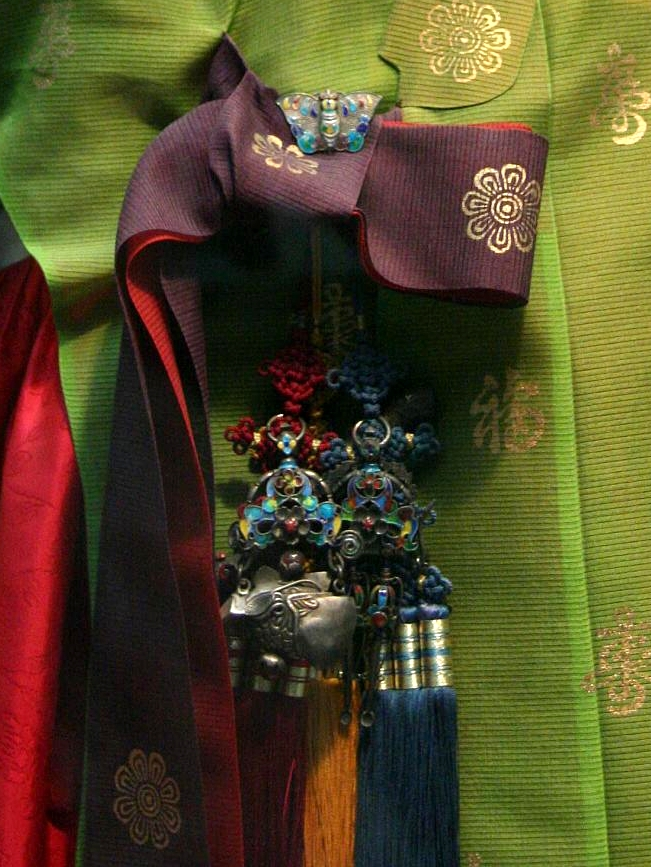
A butterfly shape of ttidon is hanging on a garment.

The ttidon or a clasp means a metal hook used in the norigae. The purpose is to attach the norigae together and be able to hang on the clothes. There are a variety of shapes for ttidon, includes butterfly shape and typical circular shape or squared shape.

== Similar items ==
- Yajin – a Chinese fashion item used to decorate the lapel of Chinese upper garments
- Jinbu – a Chinese fashion item made of yupei which were used as waist accessories, commonly referred as yaopei

== See also ==
- Chima
- Jokduri
- Jeogori
