= Yupei =

Chinese jade pendant

- A jade pendant composed of gold, amethyst, seed pearls and carved green jade, Qing dynasty
- Chinese: 玉佩
- Literal meaning: Jade pendant
Transcriptions
Standard Mandarin
- Hanyu Pinyin: Yùpèi

Yupei (Chinese: 玉佩; pinyin: Yùpèi) is a generic term for jade pendants. Yupei were popular even before Confucius was born. Jade culture is an important component of Chinese culture, reflecting both the material and spiritual culture. Jade is deeply ingrained in Chinese culture and played a role in every aspect of social life; it is also associated with positive qualities and aspects such as purity, excellence, and harmony.Jade is even more valued than gold in Chinese culture. The history of the art of jade carving in China to make ornaments, including dress ornaments, extends back to before 5000 BC. Ancient Chinese held even greater importance to yupei after it was regarded as a moral integrity by Confucius. Yupei could be used as belt or waist ornaments (such as 禁步; jinbu) and as necklaces which appeared as early as the Liangzhu culture. Strings of jade pendant are also used to decorate headwear, such as the mianguan.

== Terminology ==
Yùpèi (玉佩) is composed of the Chinese character yu (玉) which literally means 'jade' and pei (佩) which means 'pendant'.

While the term 'jade' typically refer to nephrite and jadeite in scholarly literature, the character yu (玉) in China can also be applied to other forms of precious stones and materials, such as agate, serpentine, soapstone, marble, tremolite, and hornblende The True jade (真玉; Zhēnyù) in China is actually nephrite, which has been used and prized for millennia. It is only since the 18th century that jadeite (from Burma) was discovered by Chinese carvers and started to be used in China. Jadeite became popular in jewellery making due to its bright green colour.

== Design and construction ==
Yupei could be stringed together to make an ensemble of jade pendants (which would hold at the belt and could also be composed of chains of bi (璧; "jade discs or jade rings"). Jade in the form of huang were also popular in the making of yupei and had a rigid and specific rules attached to its use. Some jade pendants also combined jades in the shape of dragons, phoenixes, anthropomorphic figures, human-dragons, and animals (birds, badgers), and/or could be carved in the shapes of diverse objects (such as gourds) or with Chinese characters (e.g. double happiness). Jades in the form of bi and cong (jade tubes) appeared as early as the Liangzhu Neolithic culture (c. 3000 BC) in Zhenjiang and Jiangsu provinces.

=== Jinbu (禁步) ===
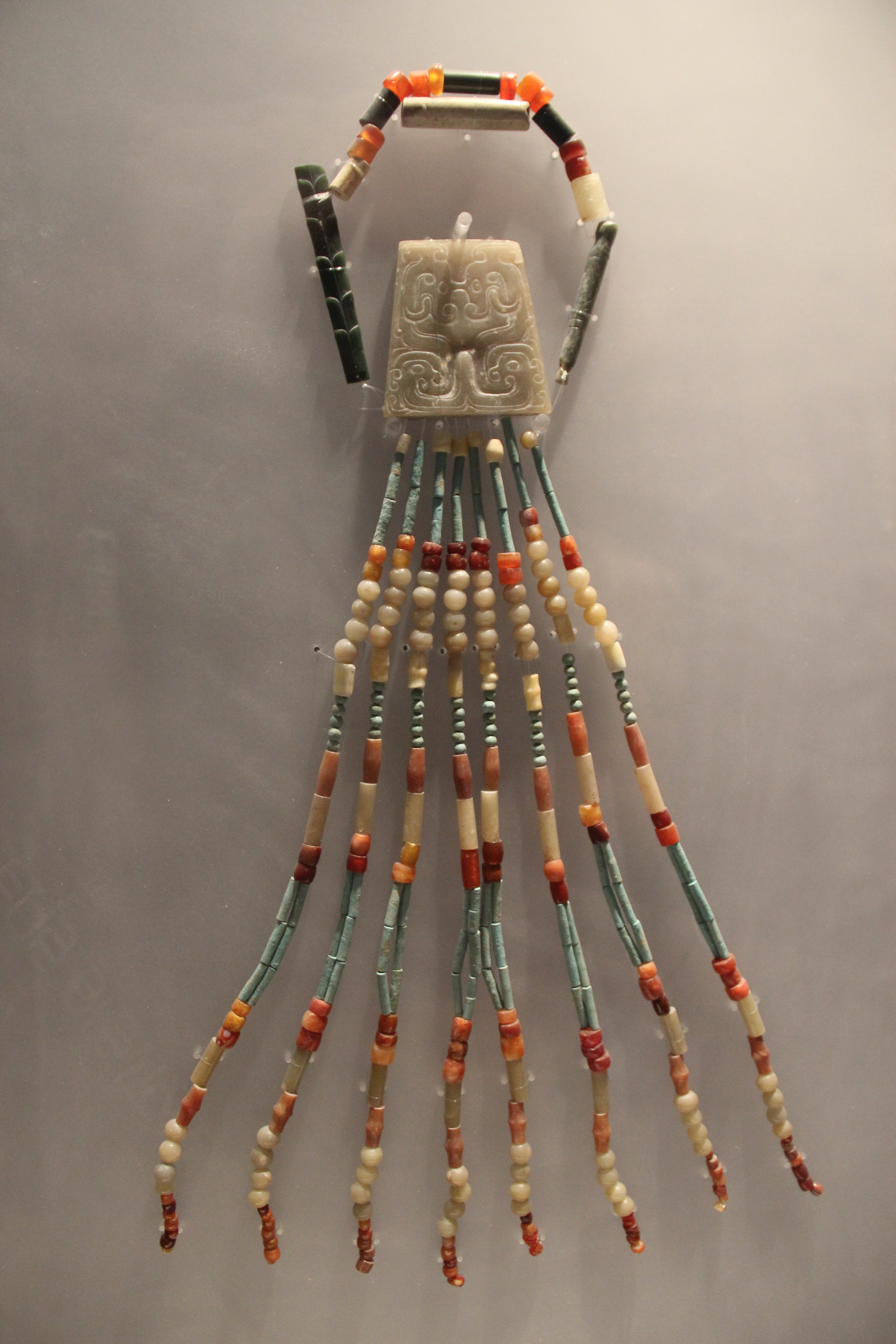
Jinbu is made of an ensemble of yupei (jade pendants) and other precious materials, unearthed from Ying state, Western Zhou

Ensemble of jade pendants and/or jade strings which were combined with other precious materials (such as silver or gold accessories) were called jinbu; jinbu were a type of yaopei (waist accessories) which were typically worn by women to press down their clothing. Jinbu appeared thousands of years ago and were initially only worn by nobles, but with time, it was gradually adopted by all women regardless of their social ranks. The jinbu also used to be an indicator of elegance and etiquette in ancient times: if the behavior of its wearer is discourteous (i.e. walking too fast), the jinbu would sound loud and thus, the jinbu would remind the wearer to mind his manners and elegance; on the other hand, if its wearer behave appropriately, the jinbu would sound melodic and pleasant. This is also explained in the chapter Yu Zao (玉藻) in the Liji:

When (the king or ruler) was walking quickly (to the court of audience), he did so to the music of the Cai Qi; when walking more quickly (back to the reception-hall), they played the Si Xia. When turning round, he made a complete circle; when turning in another direction, he did so at a right angle. When advancing, he inclined forward a little; he held himself up straight; and in all these movements, the pieces of jade emitted their tinklings. So also the man of rank, when in his carriage, heard the harmonious sounds of its bells; and, when walking, those of his pendant jade-stones; and in this way evil and depraved thoughts found no entrance into his mind.

— Translated by James Legge, Liji 《玉藻 - Yu Zao》, 37

== History ==
=== Ancient ===
In the pre-Qin period, unearthed jade pendants were found to be carved in human and anthropomorphic figures and/or combination of human and animals design (e.g. human faces, eagle sizing the head of a man), dragons (e.g. pierced-dragon shape), phoenix (e.g. pierced-phoenix shape), animals (such as birds) and carved in shape of bi, and semi-disc shape (half-bi) jade pendants. Huang and half-bi were sometimes used as component of an ensemble of jade pendant. Jade pendants could also be found in strings of jade ornaments (e.g. in the forms of small jade tubes, called cong). Strings of jade could also be combined with other forms of jade pendants. Jade pendants worn as necklace appeared as early as the Liangzhu culture.

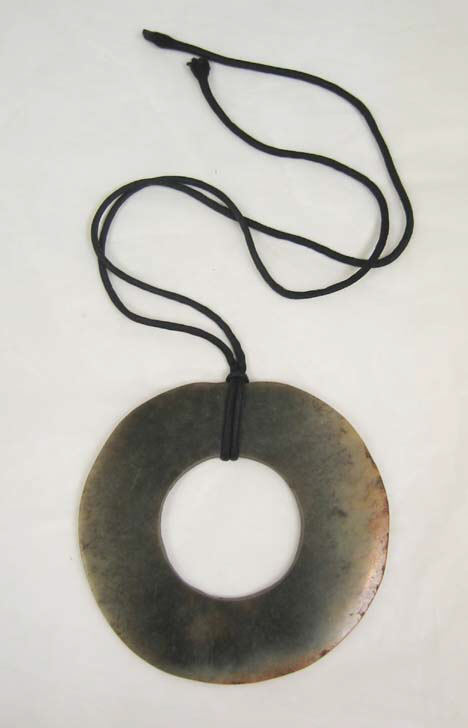
Chinese Jade pendant in the form of a bi, 2000–1500 B.C.

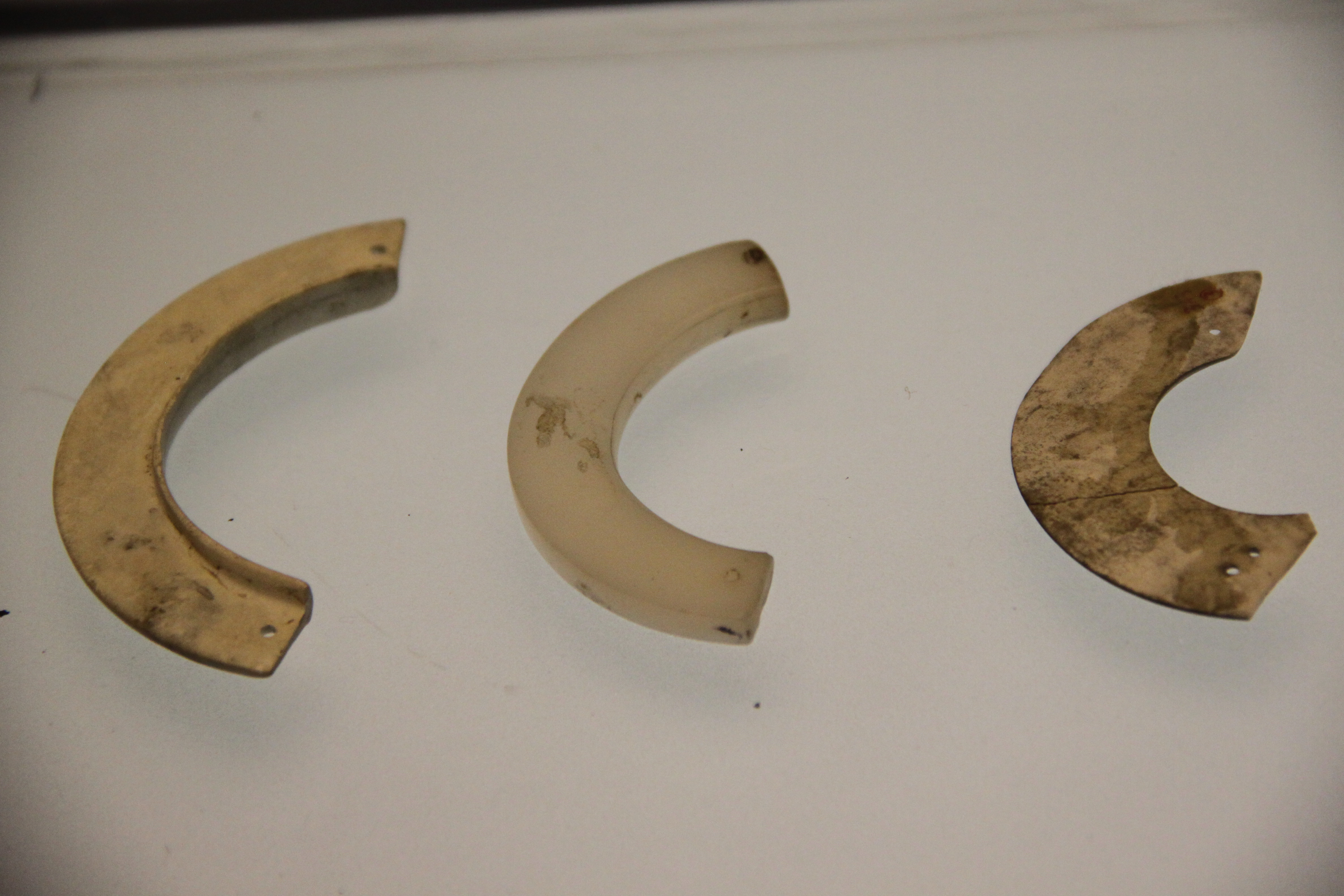
Yupei in the shape of huang, Shang dynasty,

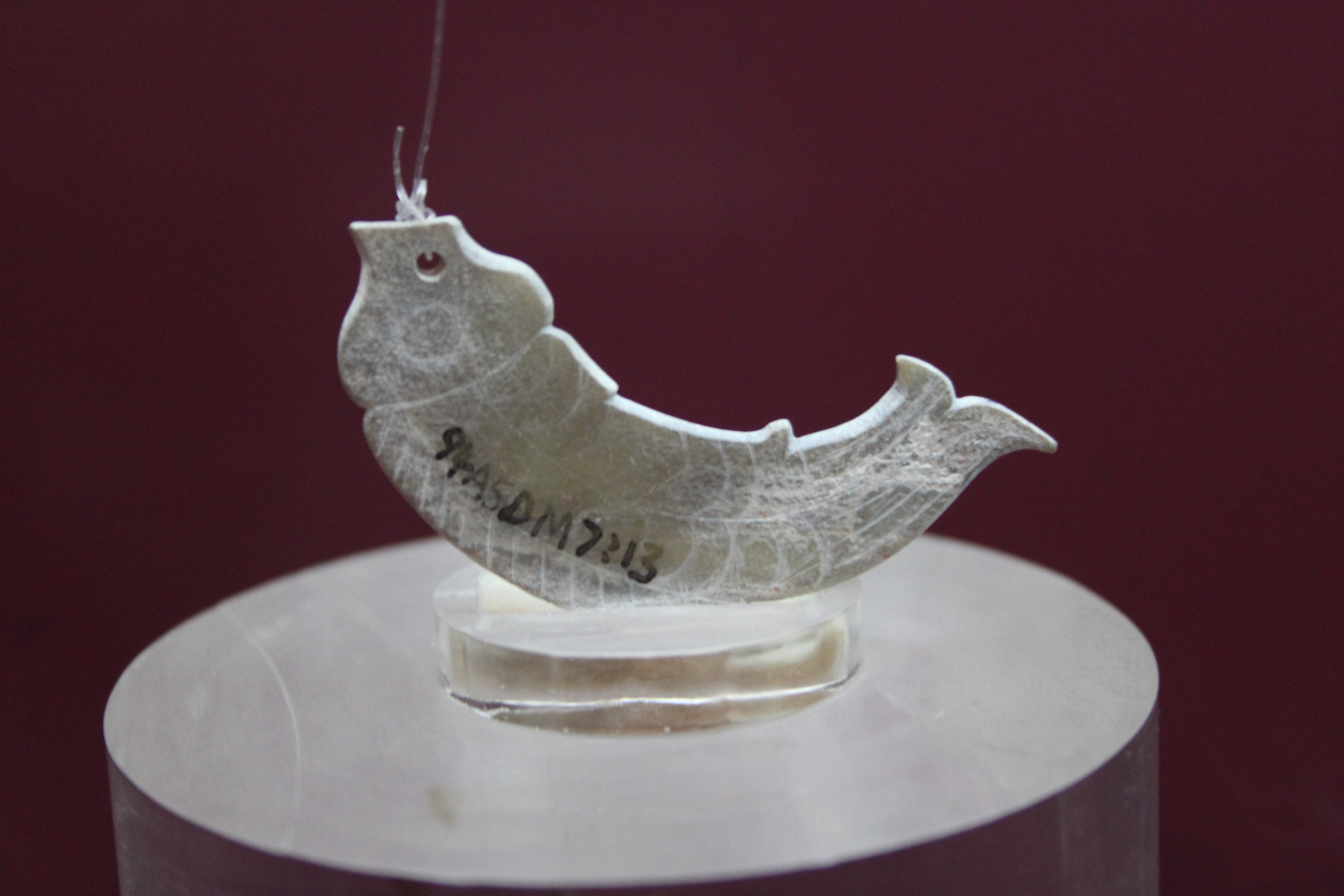
Fish-shaped yupei, Shang dynasty.

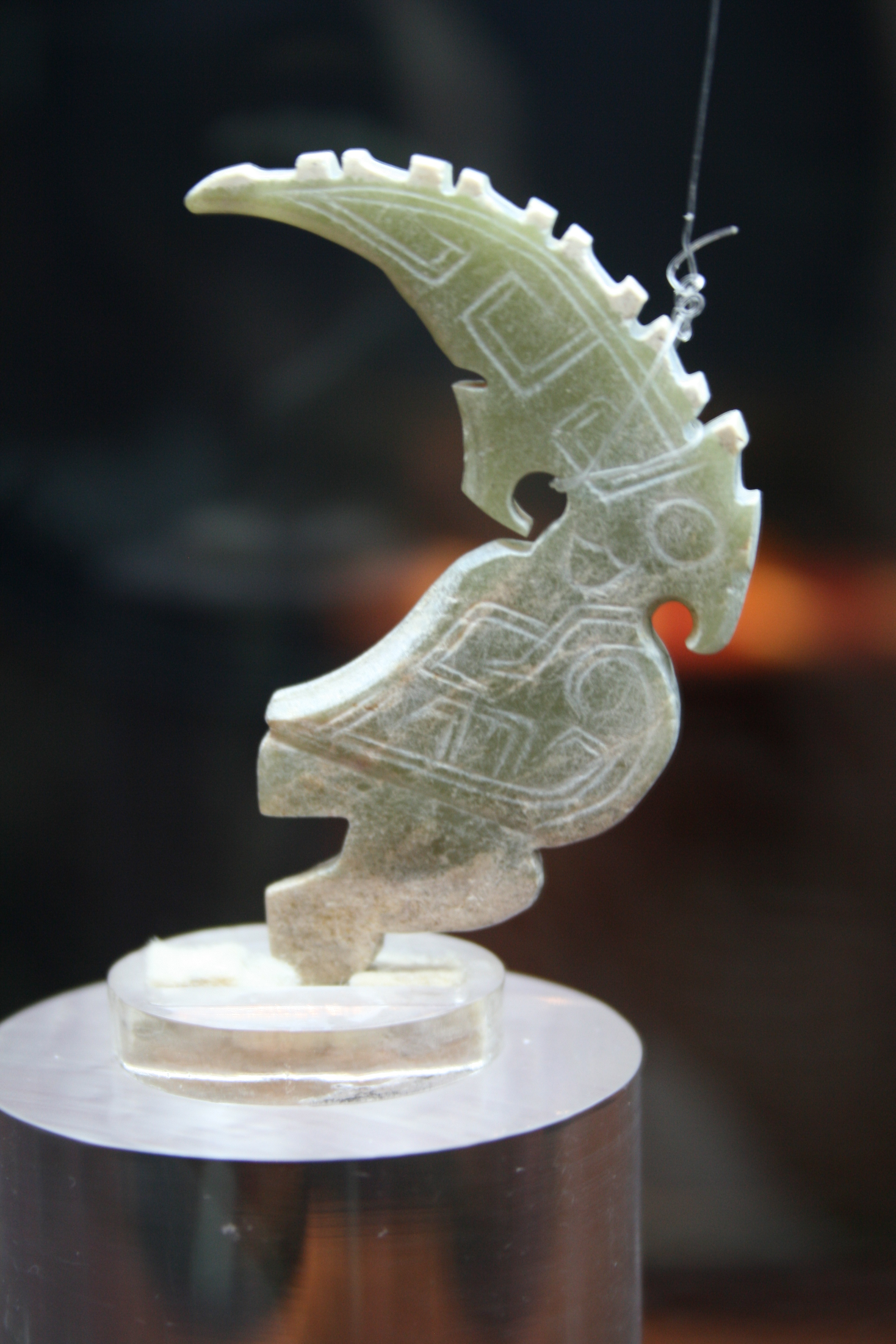
Bird-shaped yupei, Shang dynasty.

==== Zhou dynasty ====
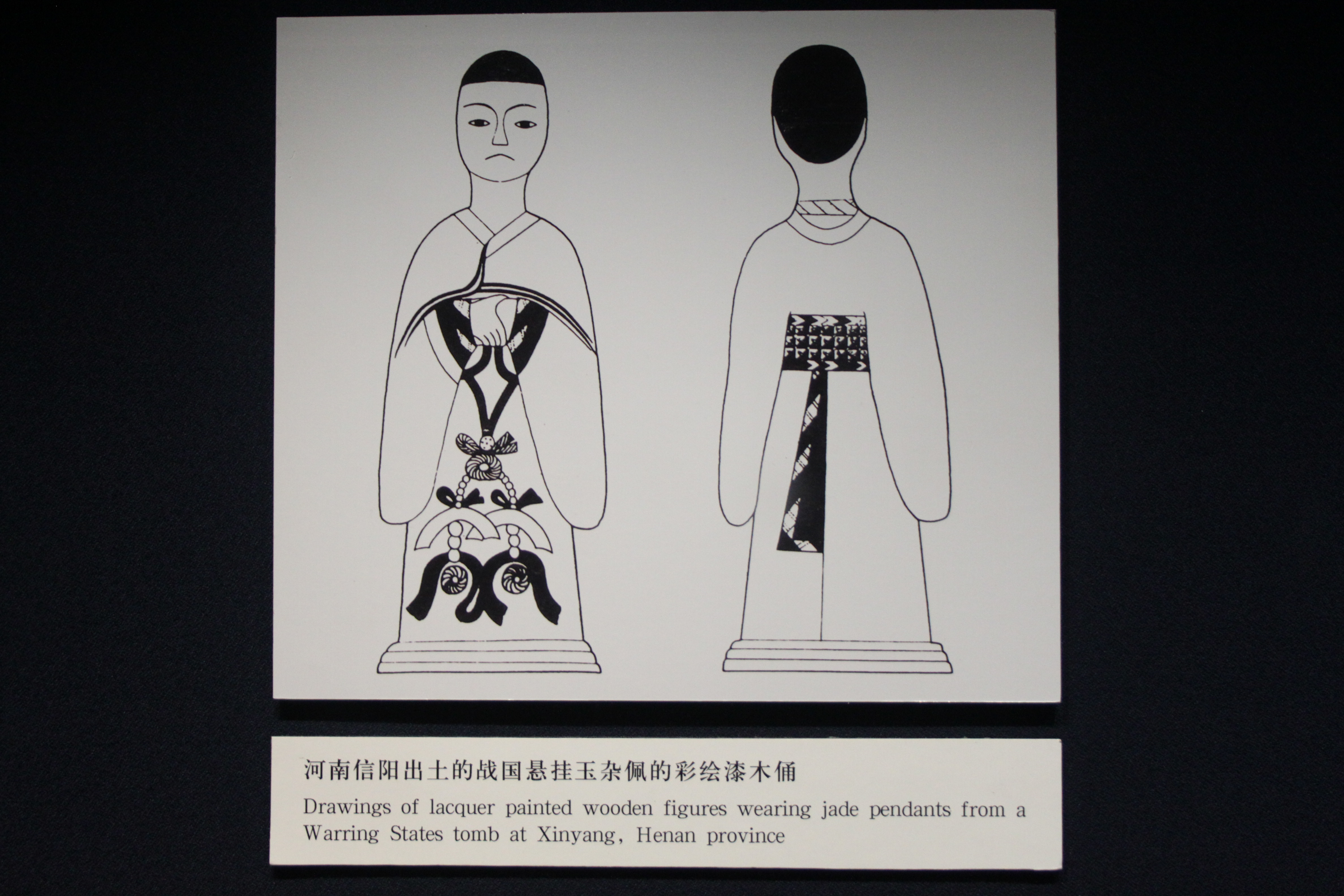
Painted figures from Warring States Tomb showing wearing of ensemble of yupei, also called jinbu.

In the Western Zhou, people started to associate moral connotations to the use of jade, such as morality. This eventually led to the formation of Chinese jade belief system of how "a gentleman compares virtues to a gem", a concept which was later fully elaborated by Confucius, who would then compare the qualities of a jade to the 5 virtues (kindness, wisdom, integrity, courage, and purity) of a gentleman (junzi) in the Book of Rites (Liji).

White jade, Hotan jade in particular, was well-liked in the Western Zhou; however, strict regulations on the use of jades, based on their qualities and colours, were established. While rulers of the Western Zhou would use expensive jades (like white Hotan jade), people of lower status could only use common jades. Ensemble of yupei (jinbu) were a distinctive form of ritual jade ware in the Western Zhou dynasty, and jades in huang shape were dominant types of yupei found in the ensemble. The jade pendant ensemble consisted of various parts which had to be connected together based on certain rules.

In the Zhou dynasty, ensemble of yupei would often hang down at the waist belt of its wearer. Ensemble of yupei which were made entirely of jade may have only used by rulers of kingdoms (possibly dukes, marquises, their wives and aristocrats of similar titles) as the ritual system which is stipulated in the Liji indicates that pure jade could not be used by the ministers of kings. According to the chapter Yu Zao (玉藻):

All wore the jade-stone pendant at the girdle, excepting during the mourning rites. (At the end of the middle string) in it was the tooth-like piece, colliding with the others. A man of rank was never without this pendant, excepting for some sufficient reason; he regarded the pieces of jade as emblematic of the virtues (which he should cultivate). The son of Heaven had his pendant composed of beads of white jade, hung on dark-coloured strings; a duke or marquis, his of jade-beads of hill-azure, on vermilion strings; a Great officer, his of beads of aqua-marine, on black strings; an heir-son, his of beads of Yu jade, on variegated strings; an ordinary officer, his of beads of jade-like quartz, on orange-coloured strings. Confucius wore at his pendant balls of ivory, five inches (round), on gray strings.

— Translated by James Legge, Liji 《玉藻 - Yu Zao》, 39

Moreover, according to the Confucian jade-related belief system which also stems from the Liji: in ancient China, yupei ensemble (which symbolizes virtue) must always been worn by gentlemen except when they are mourning. Wearing yupei ensemble also served to: (1) remind its wearer to walk in an orderly manner which would eventually make gentlemen develop an elegant and regular walking pattern over the years despite being constrained by the jade pendants, and (2) remind the gentlemen to behave according to the decorum which is based on the sound of the jade tinkles when they walk.

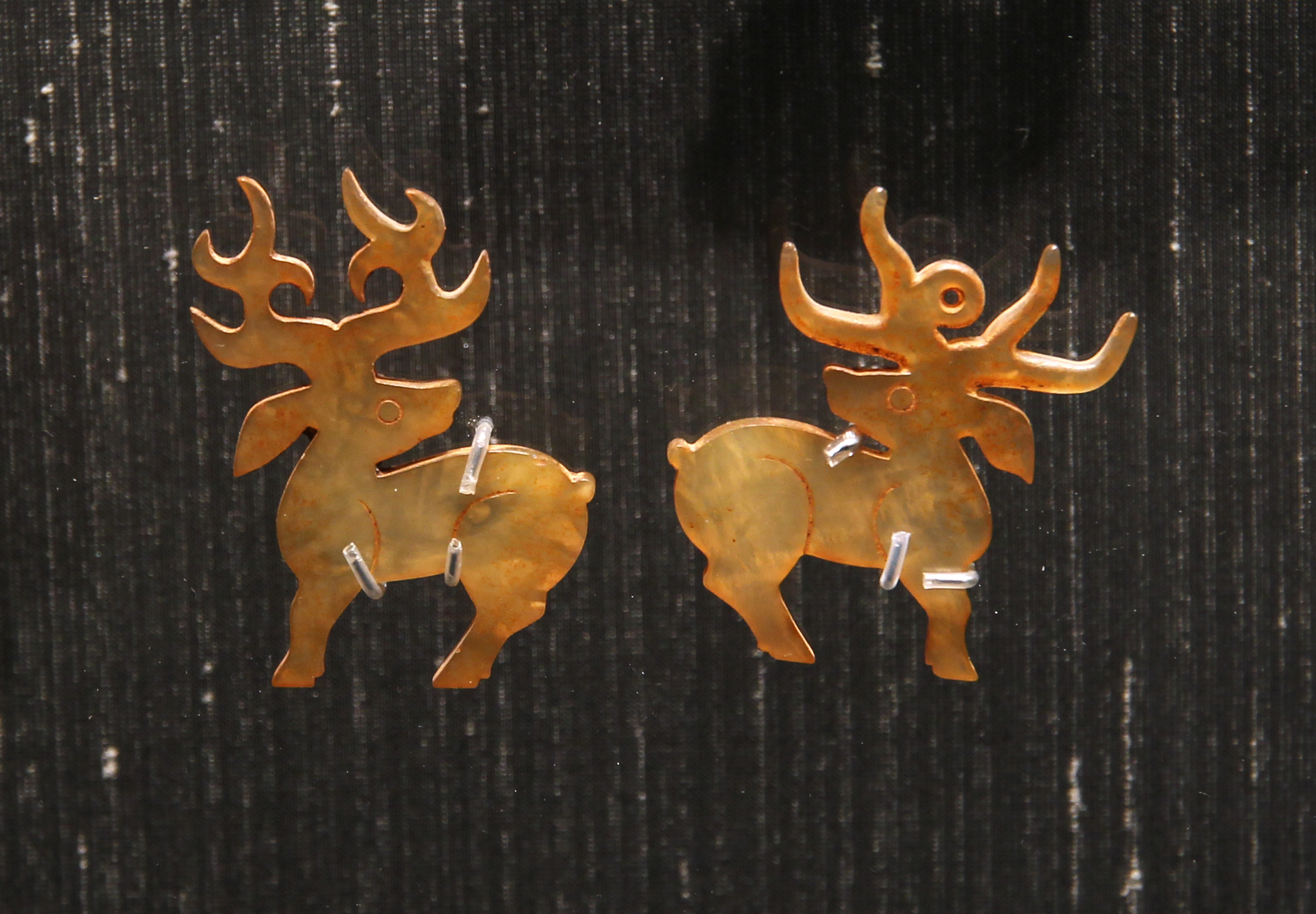
Jade pendants in the form of stags, Western Zhou.

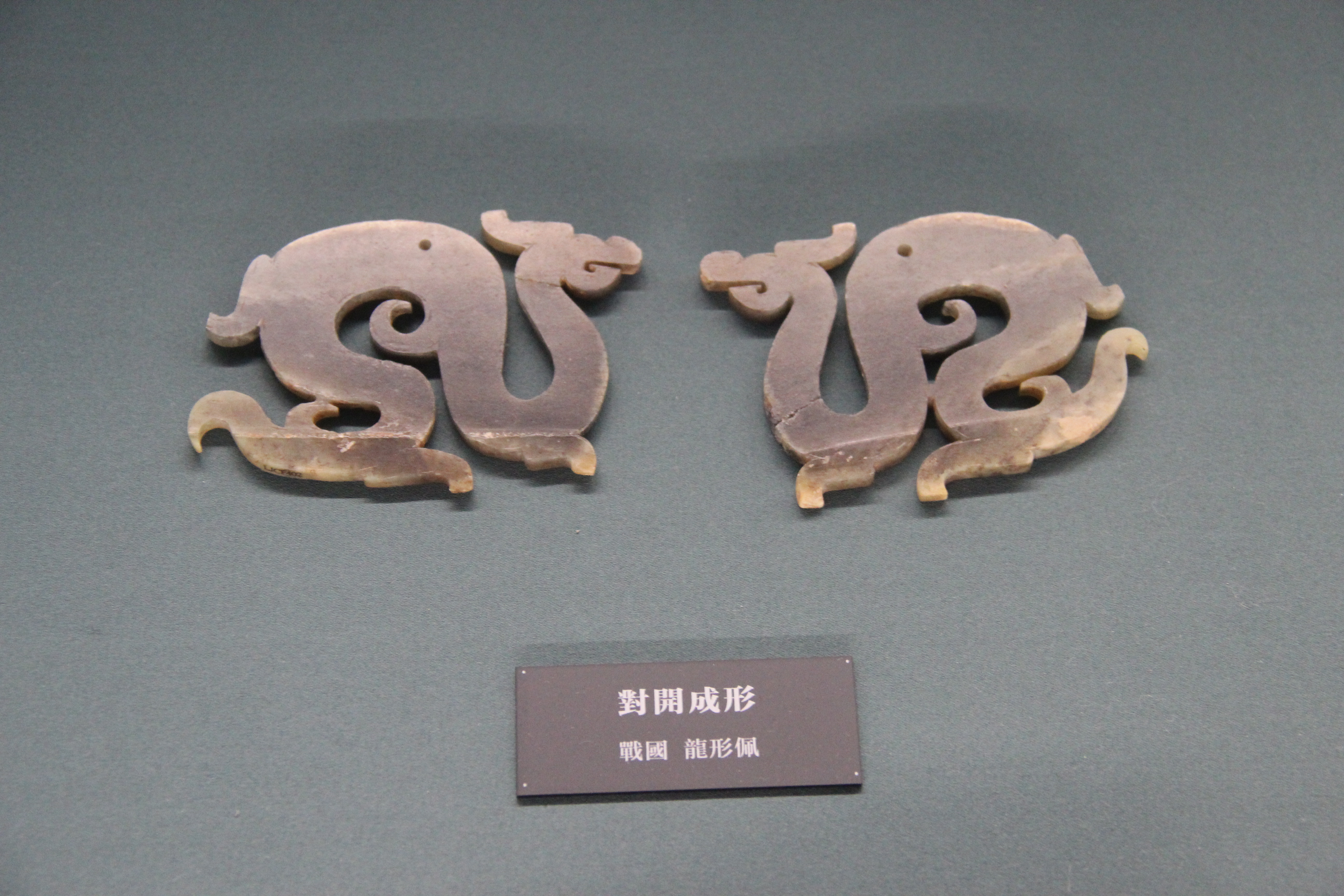
Chinese dragon-shaped yupei, Warring States period

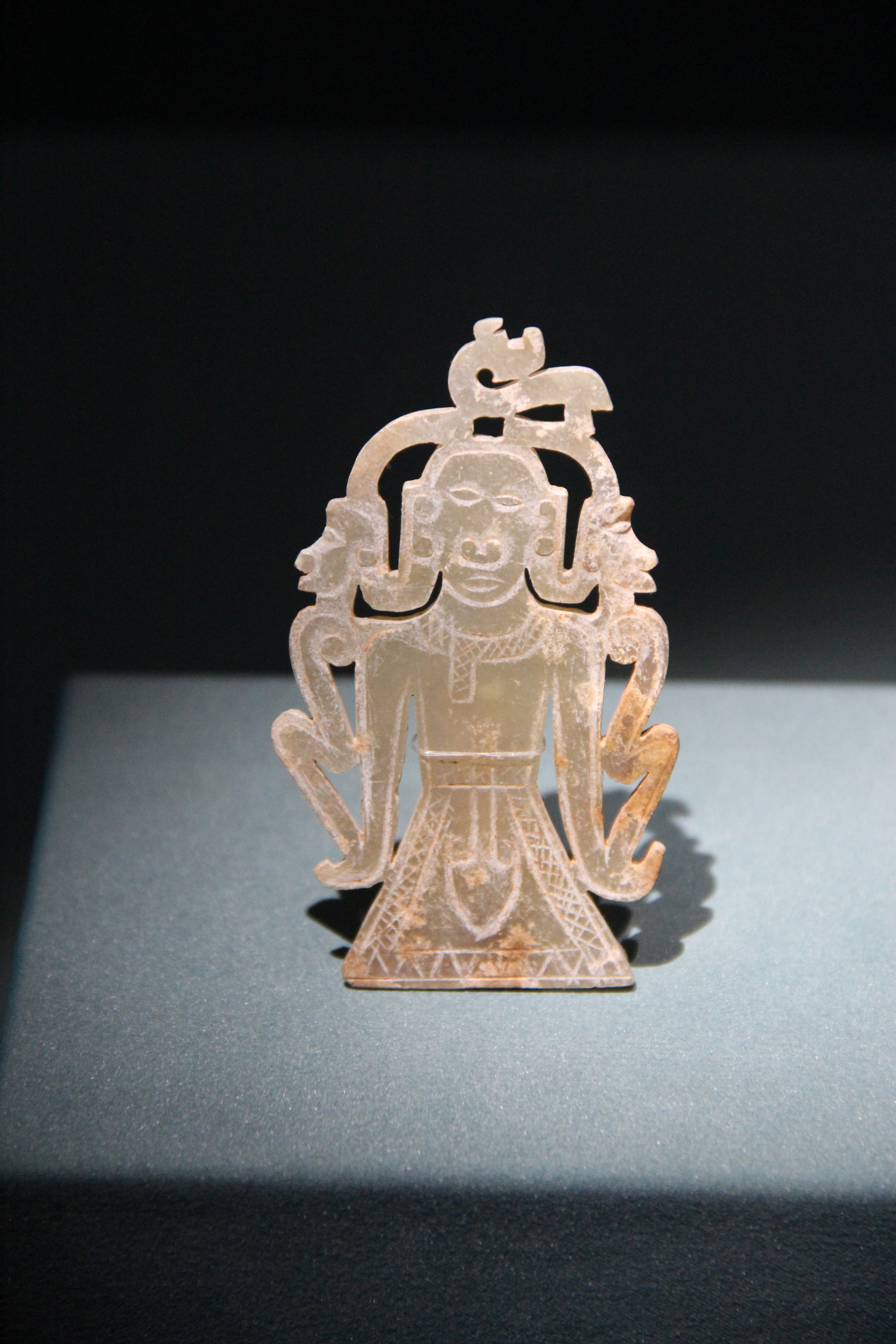
Human-shaped yupei, Late Western Zhou

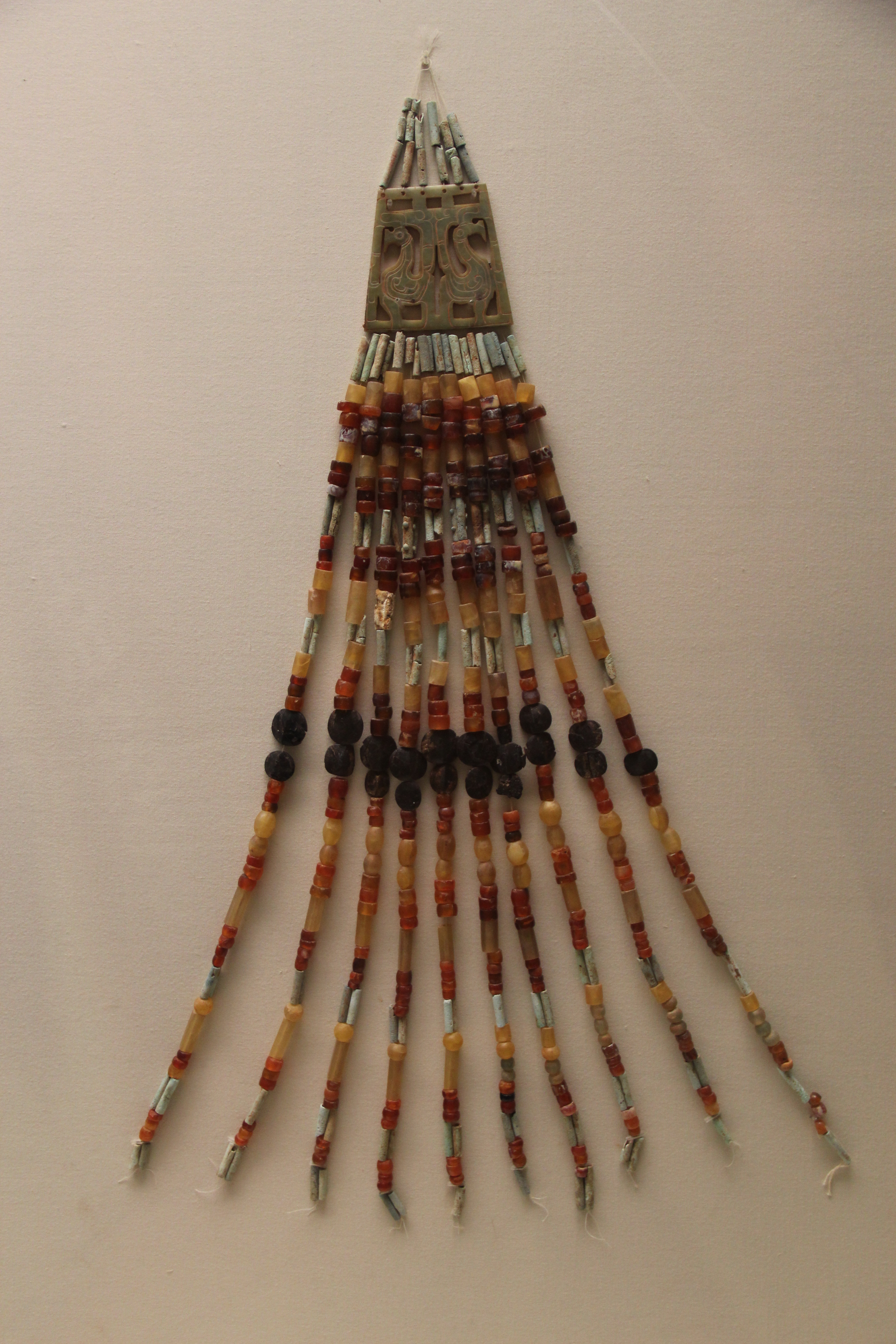
Yupei ensemble, Western Zhou.

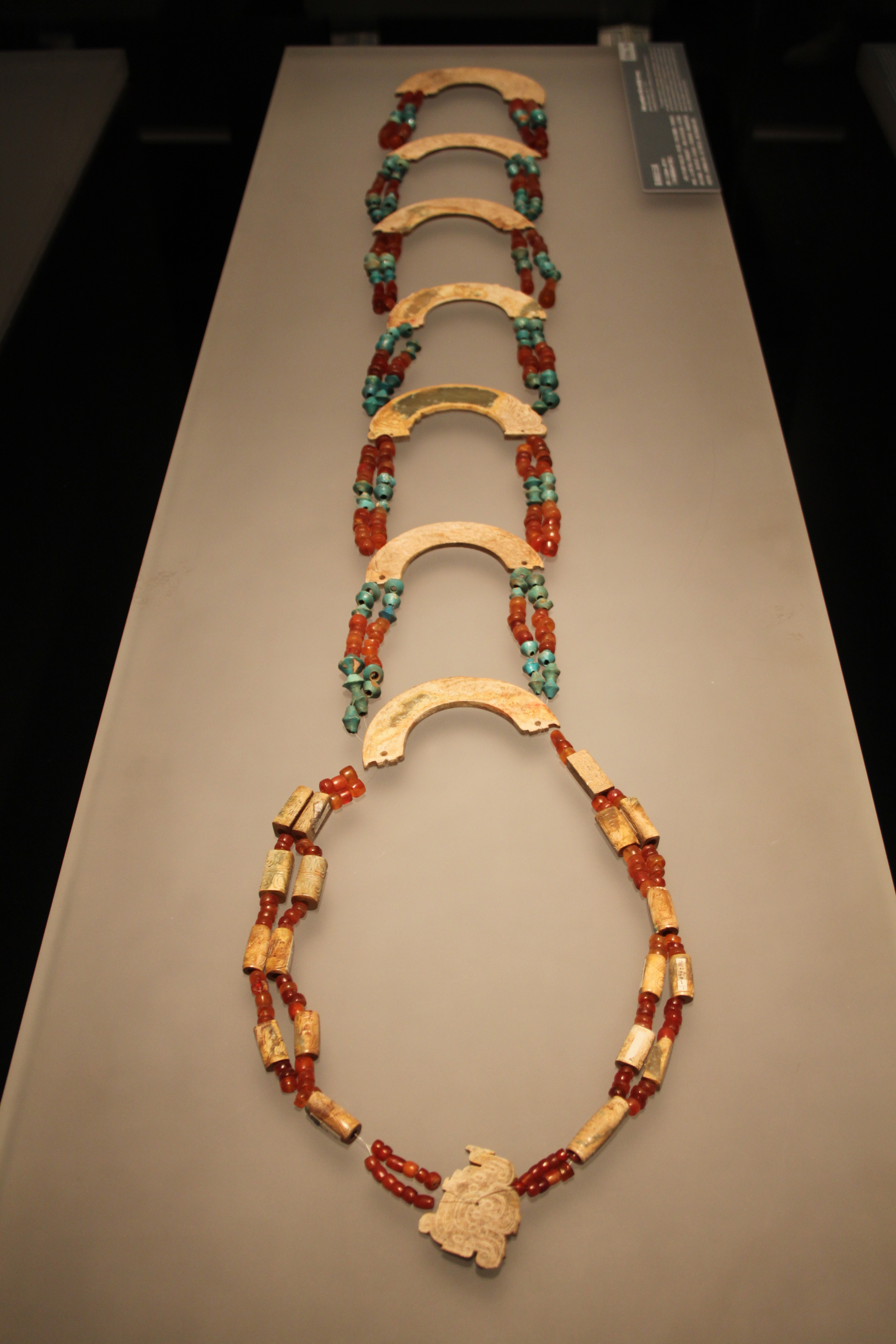
Yupei ensemble with Huang, Western Zhou

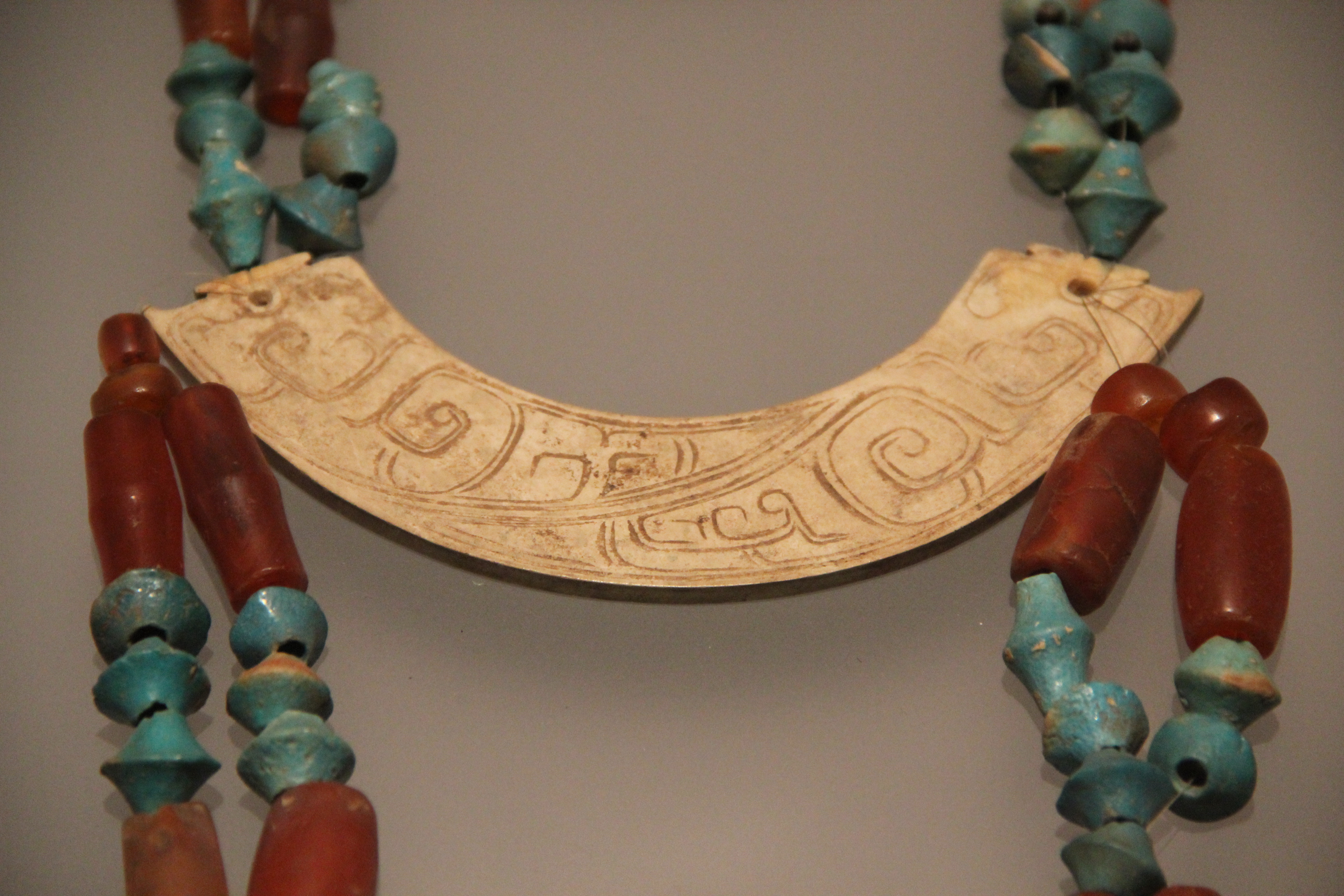
Jade Huang from a yupei ensemble, Western Zhou.

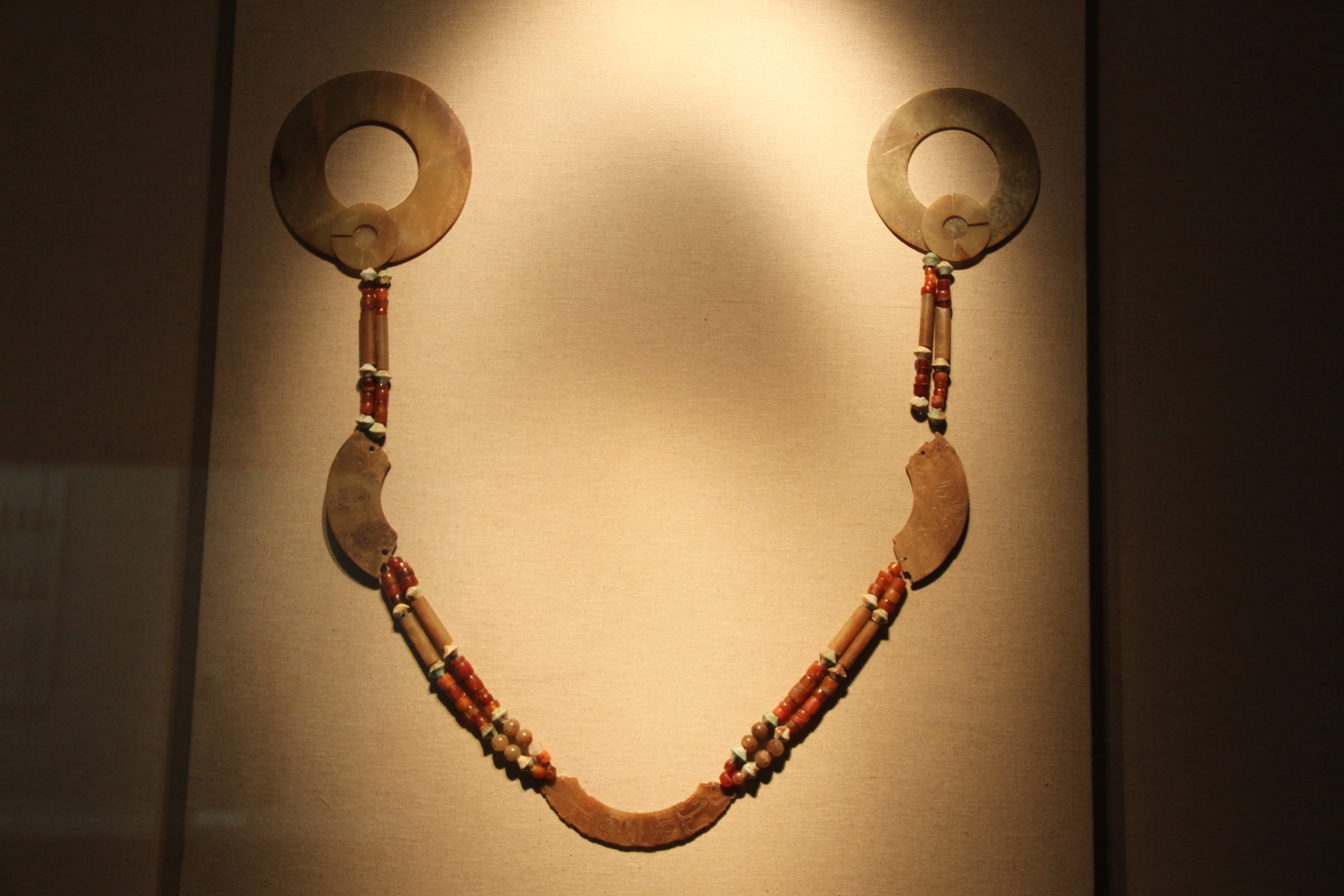
Yupei ensemble composed of bi (disc), huang and cong (jade tubes), Western Zhou

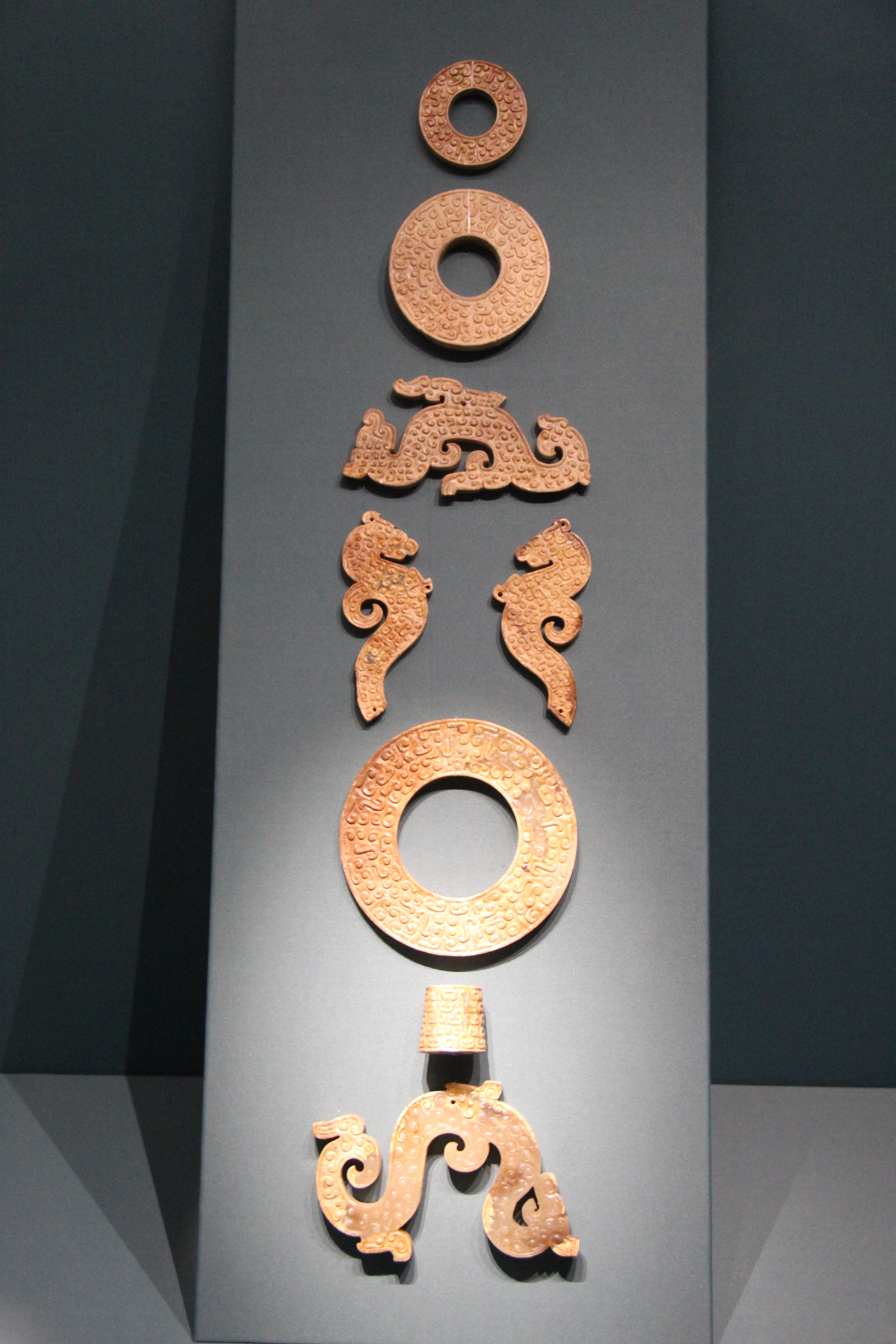
Jade Ornaments composed of bi and huang jade, and dragon-shaped jade, Late Spring & Autumn period

=== Tang dynasty ===
It is confirmed based on paintings and stone engravings that ensemble of jade pendants were suspended from the belt of women in the Tang dynasty.

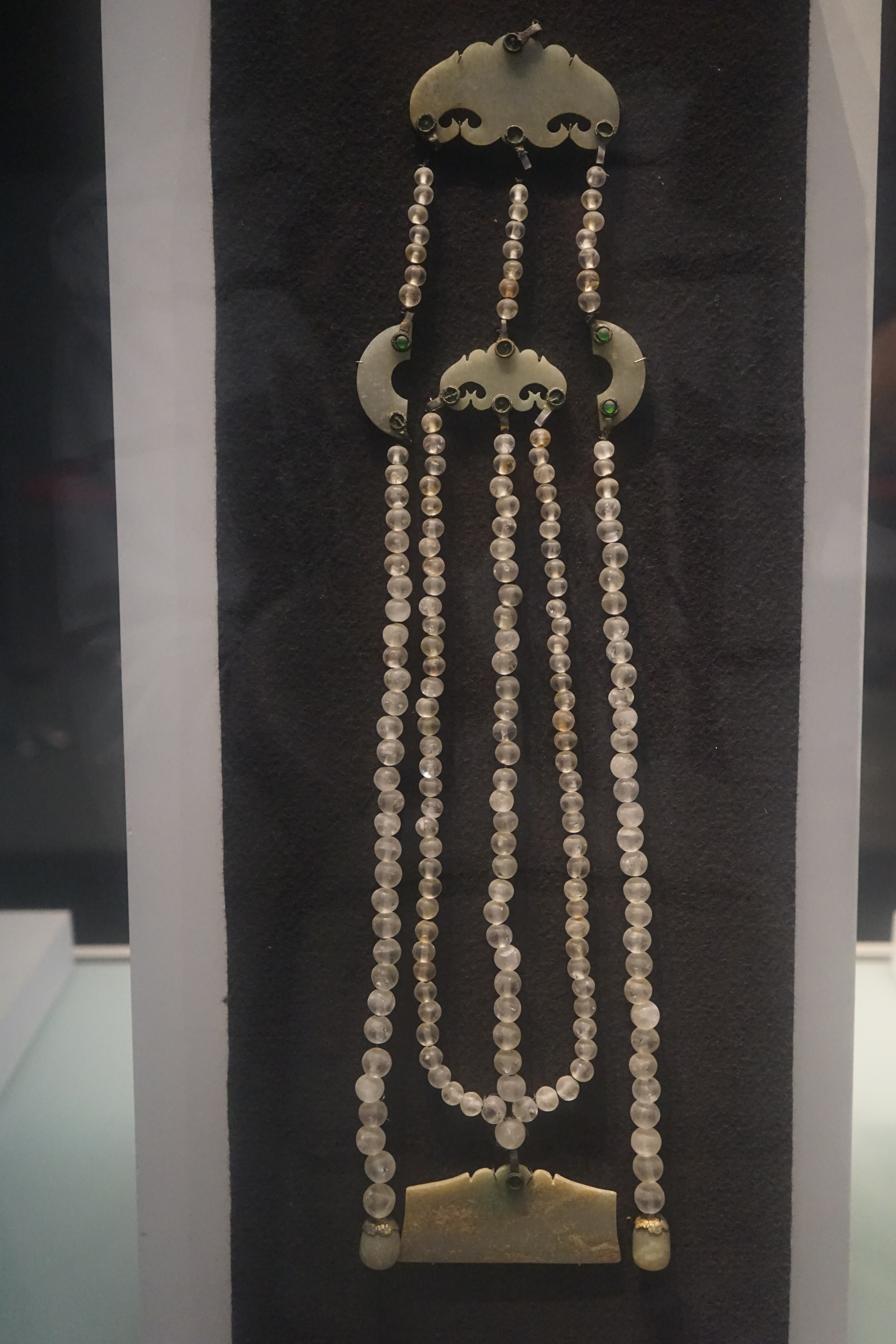
Ensemble of Yùpèi (玉佩), Tang dynasty.

=== Qing dynasty ===
In Qing, it was popular for women to wear green, translucent jade jewelry; pendants which were carved in the shape of a curving dragon was popular.

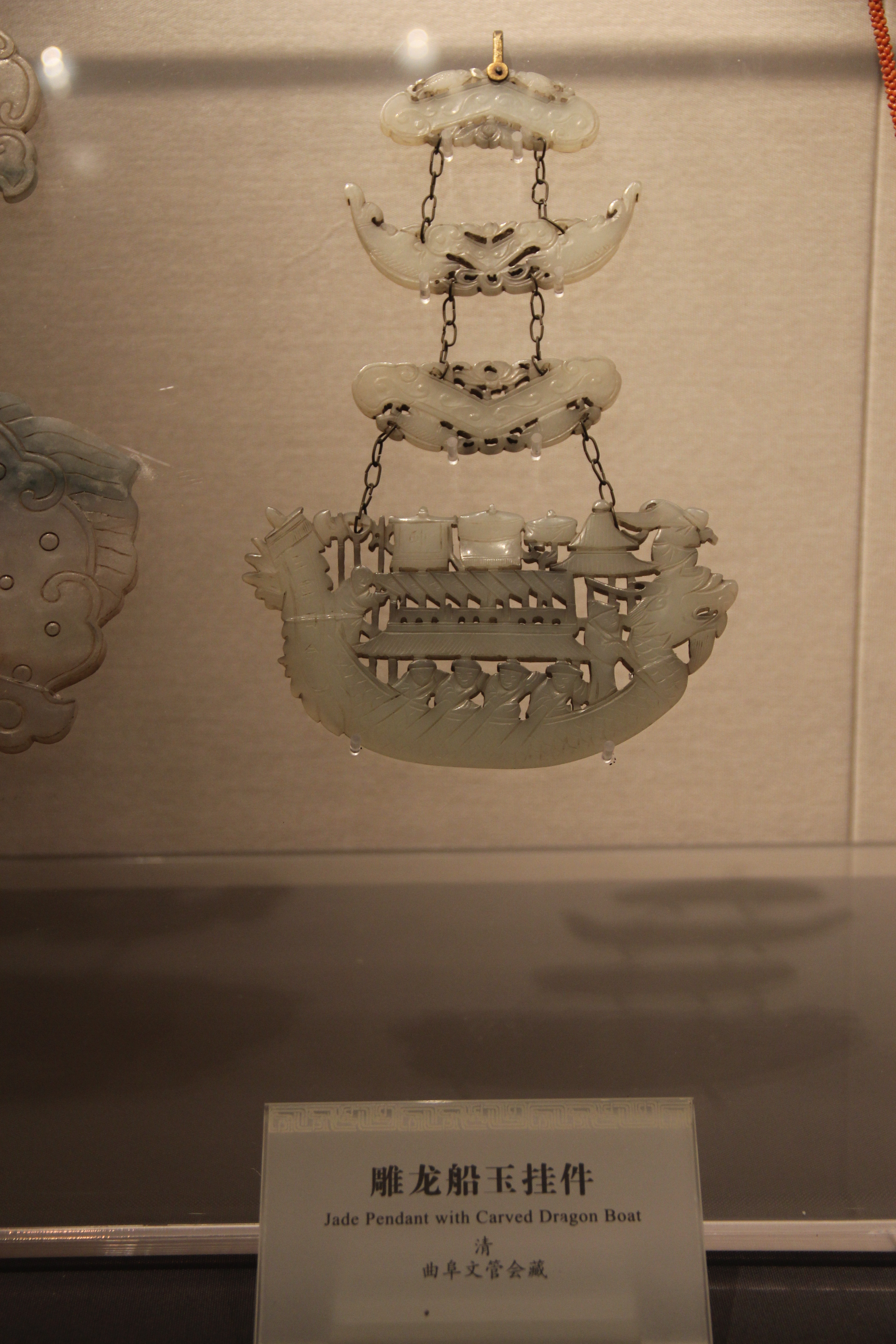

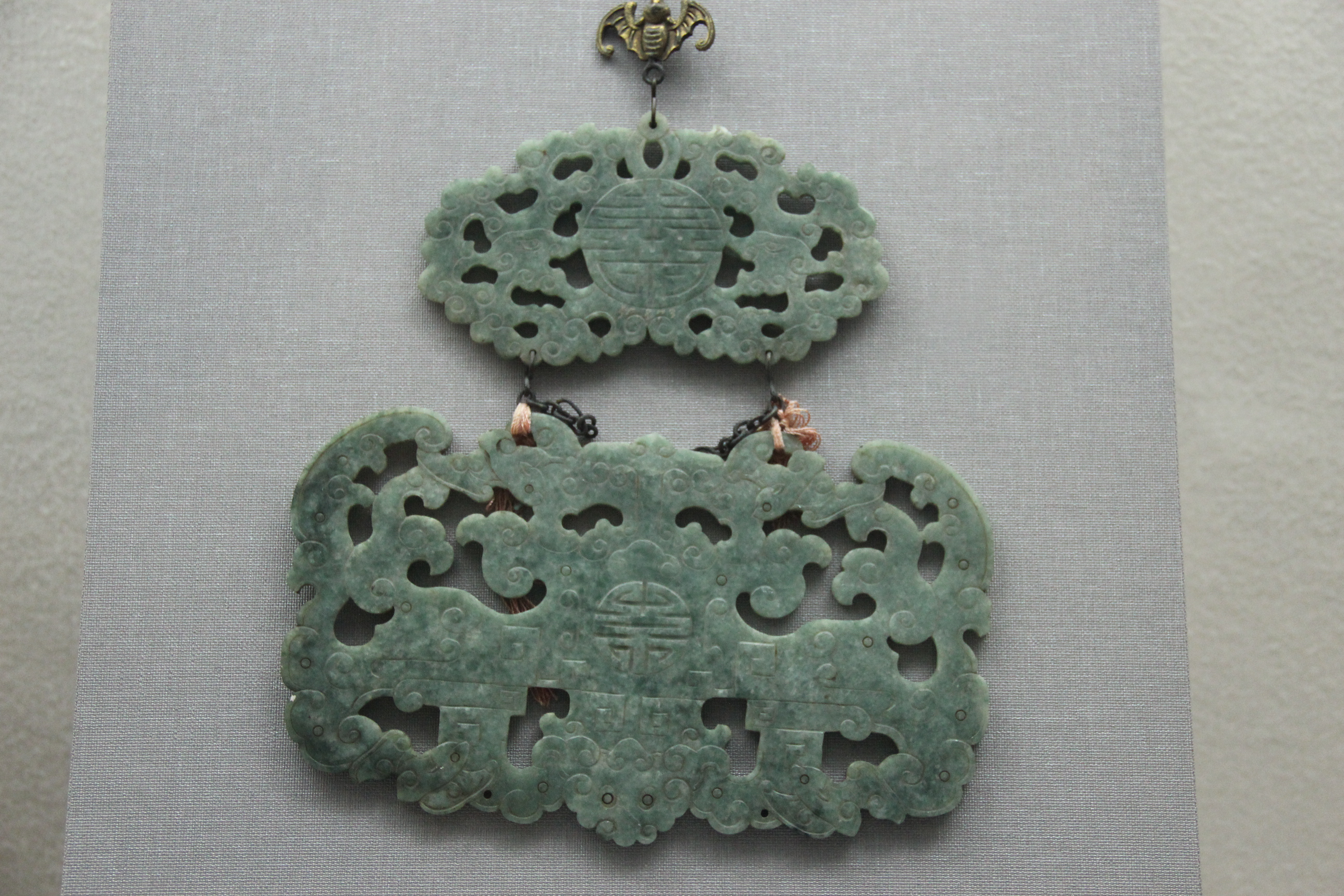
Jade pendant, Qing dynasty

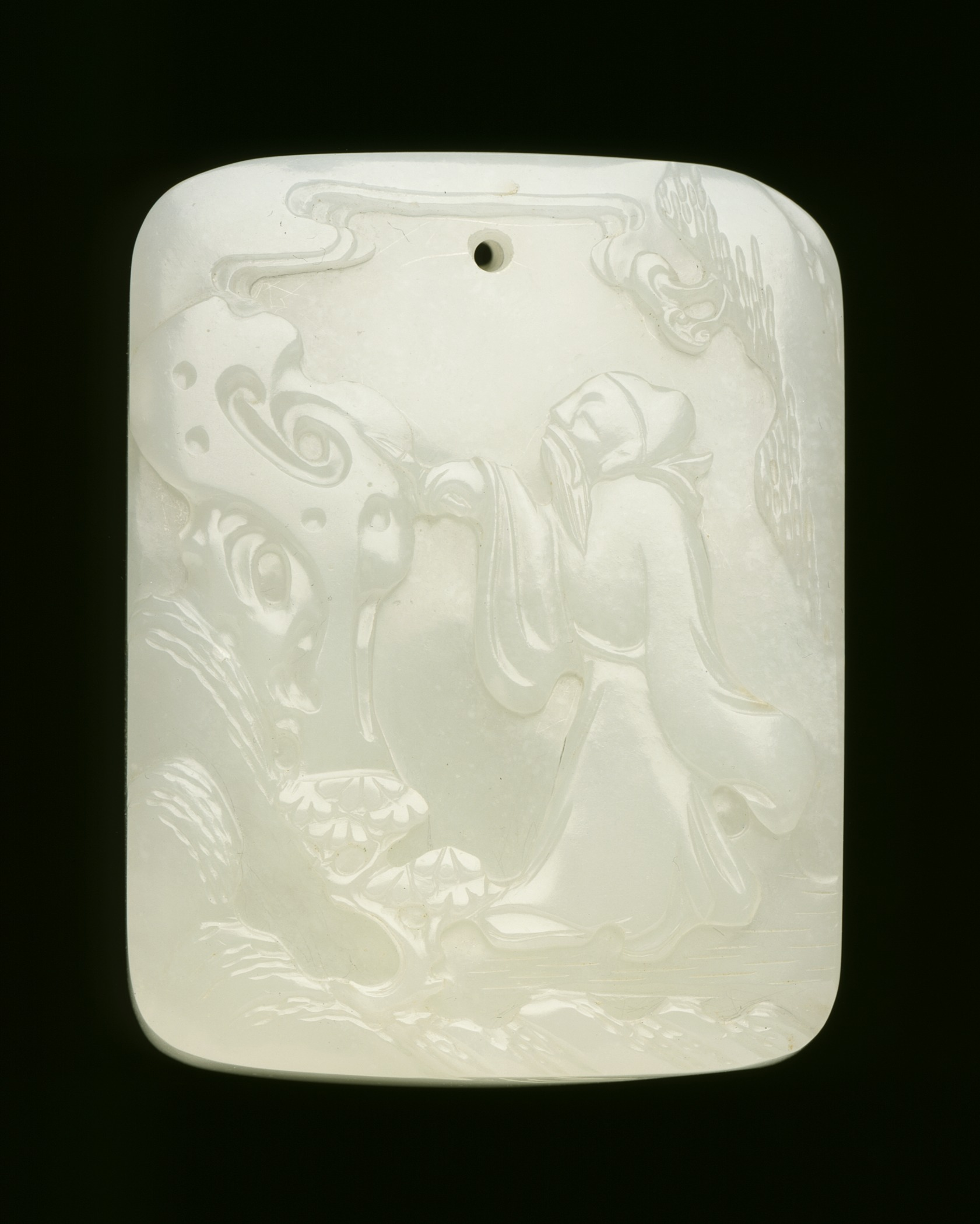
Jade plaque pendant

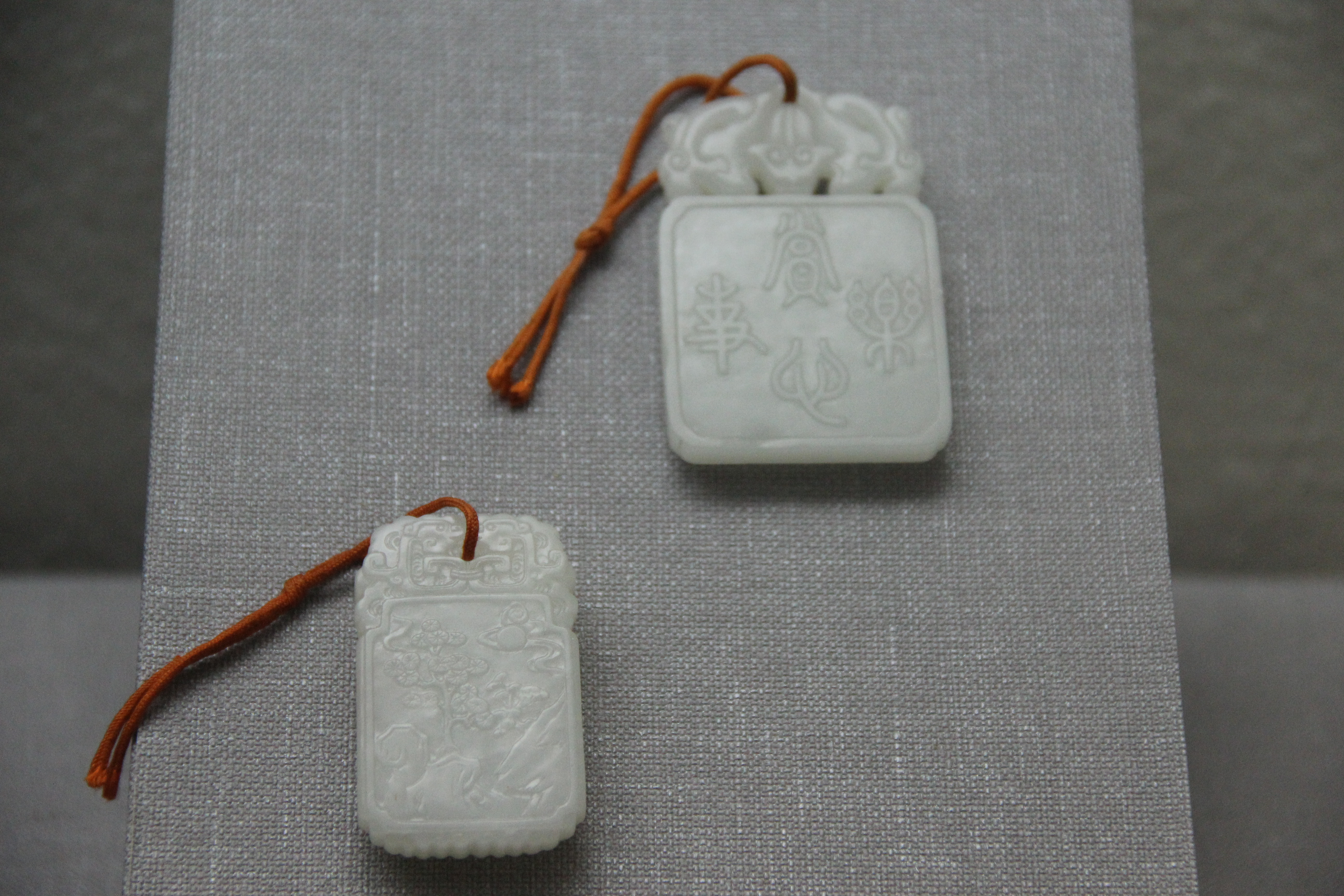

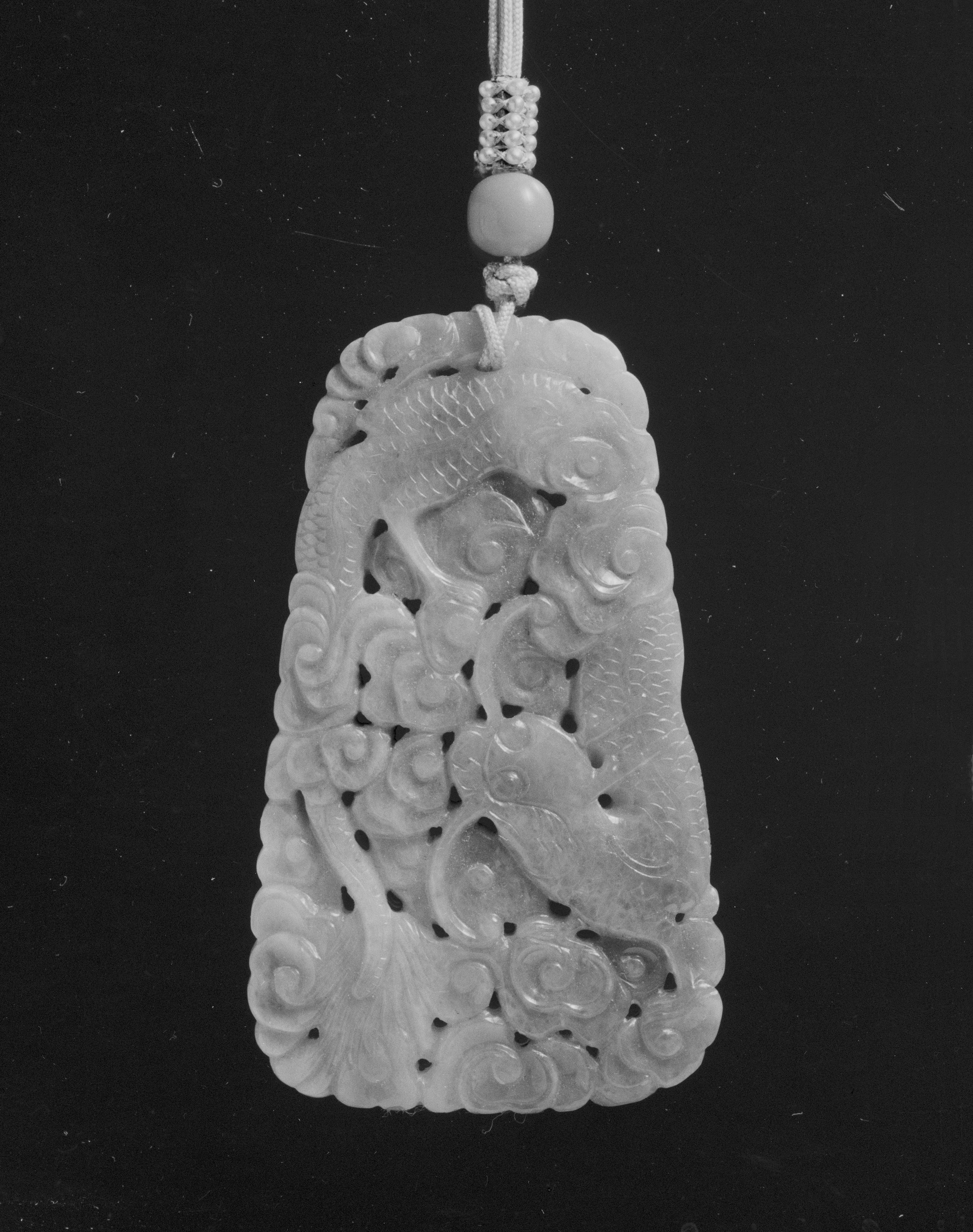
Yupei carved with dragons, Qing dynasty, 20th century.

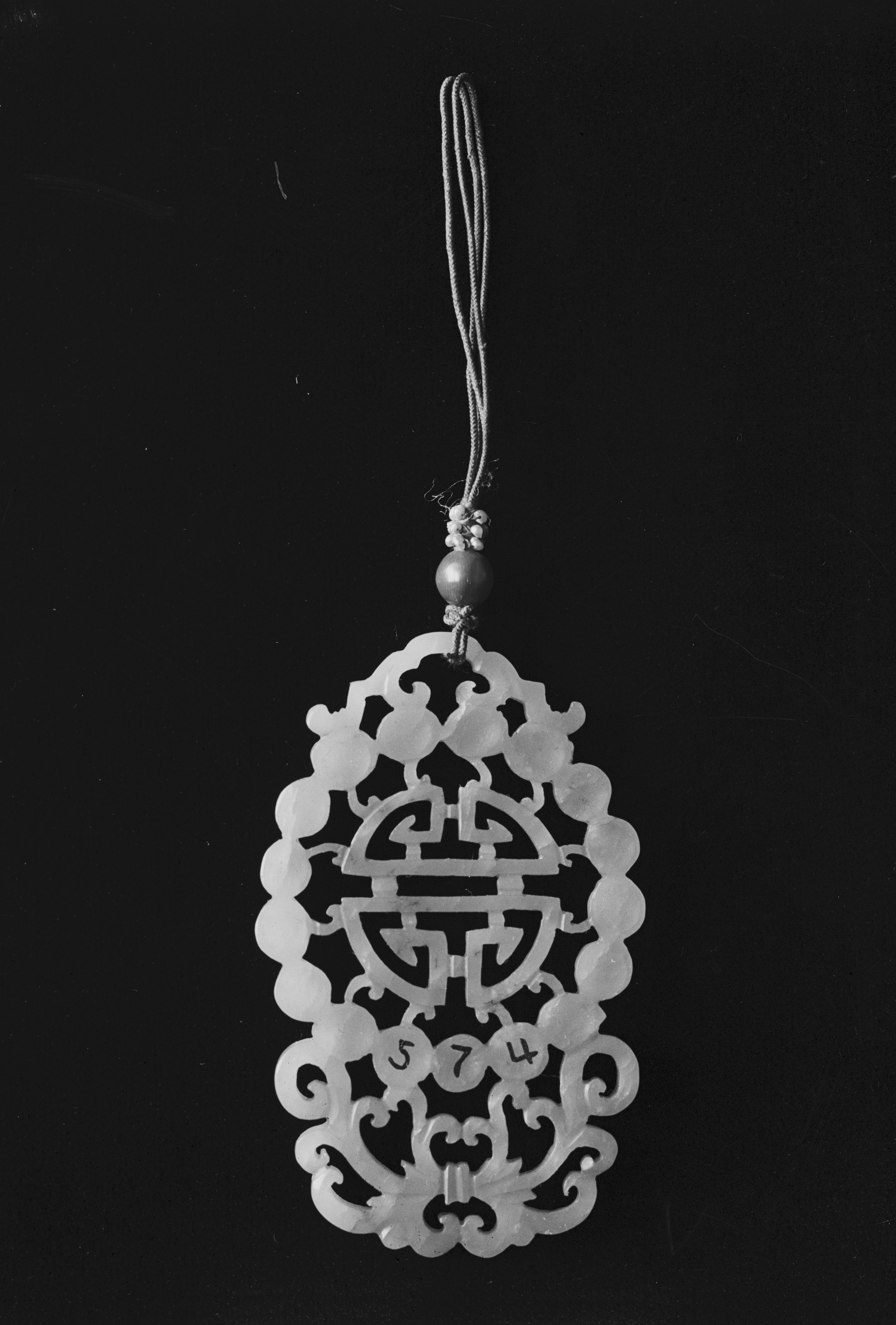
Yupei, Qing dynasty, 18th–19th century

== Gallery ==
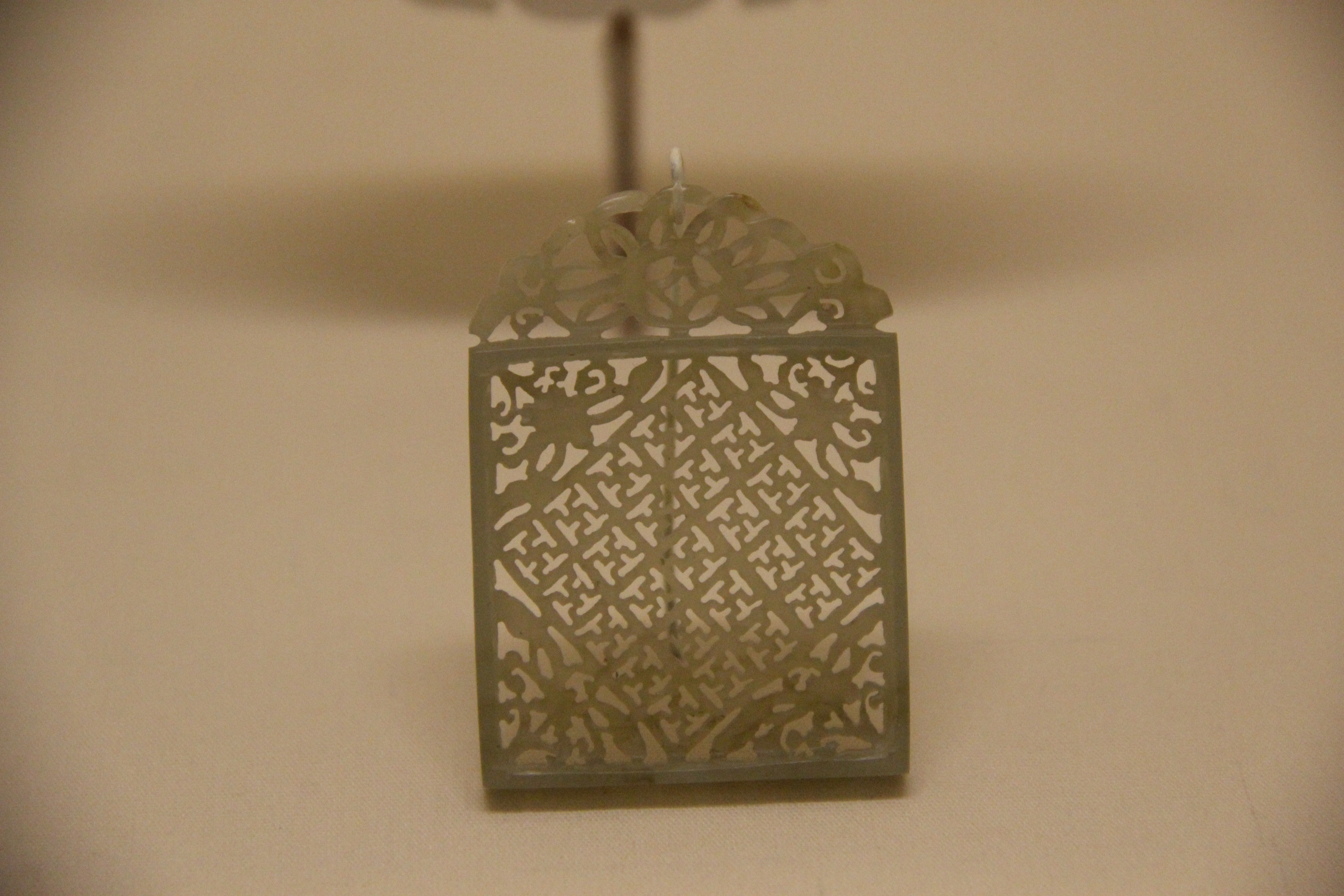
Ming Jade pendant

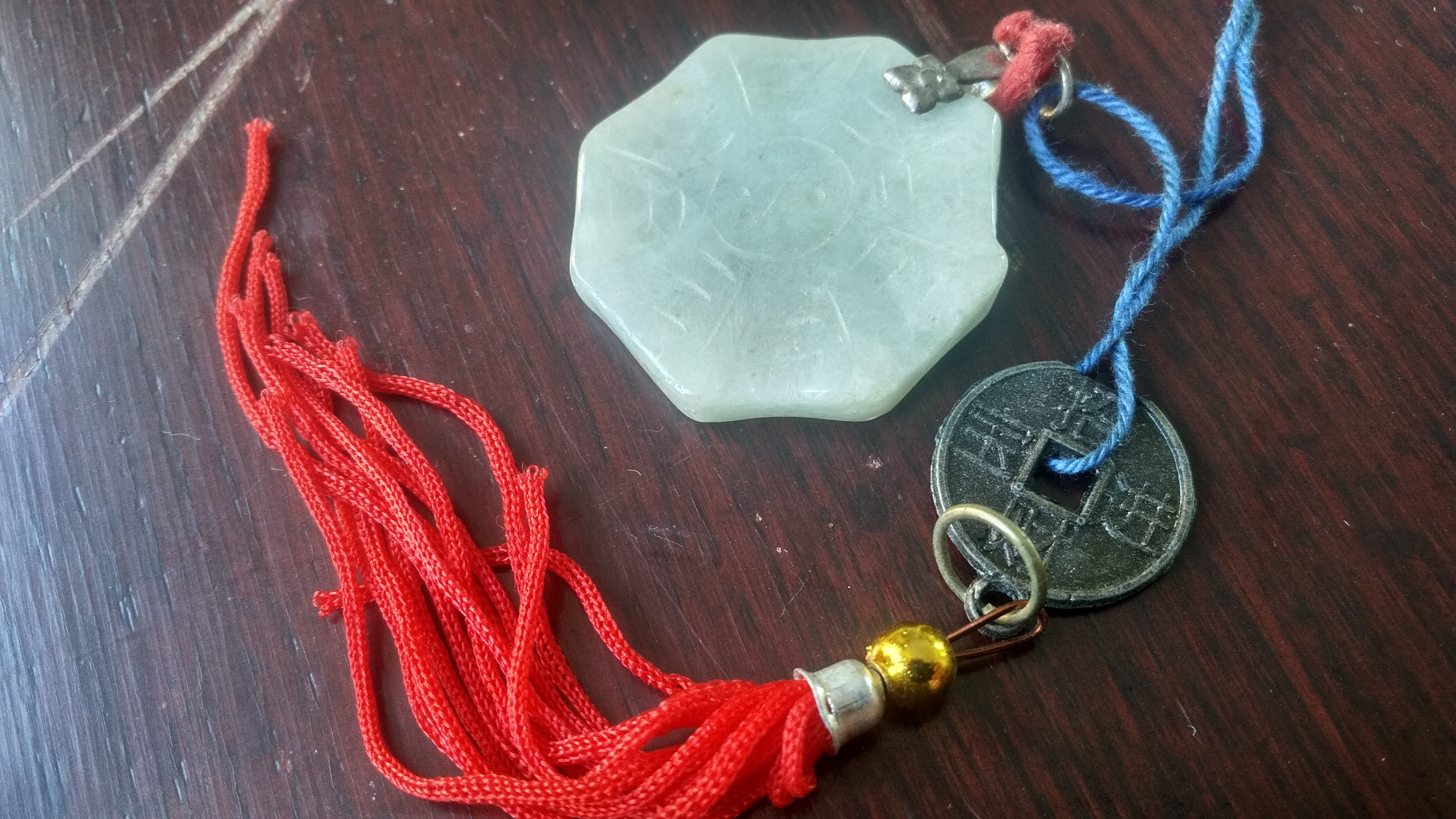
Yupei with bagua and yin and yang symbol, 2018

== Similar items ==
- Yajin - Chinese accessories which hungs on clothing lapels at the chest area
- Shibazi - An 18-beads bracelet, which can be hang on Chinese clothing lapels at the chest area
- Yaopei
- Norigae - A Korean clothing accessory

== See also ==
- Hanfu
- List of hanfu
- List of hanfu accessories
- Chaozhu (Court necklace)
