= Longhua (collar) =

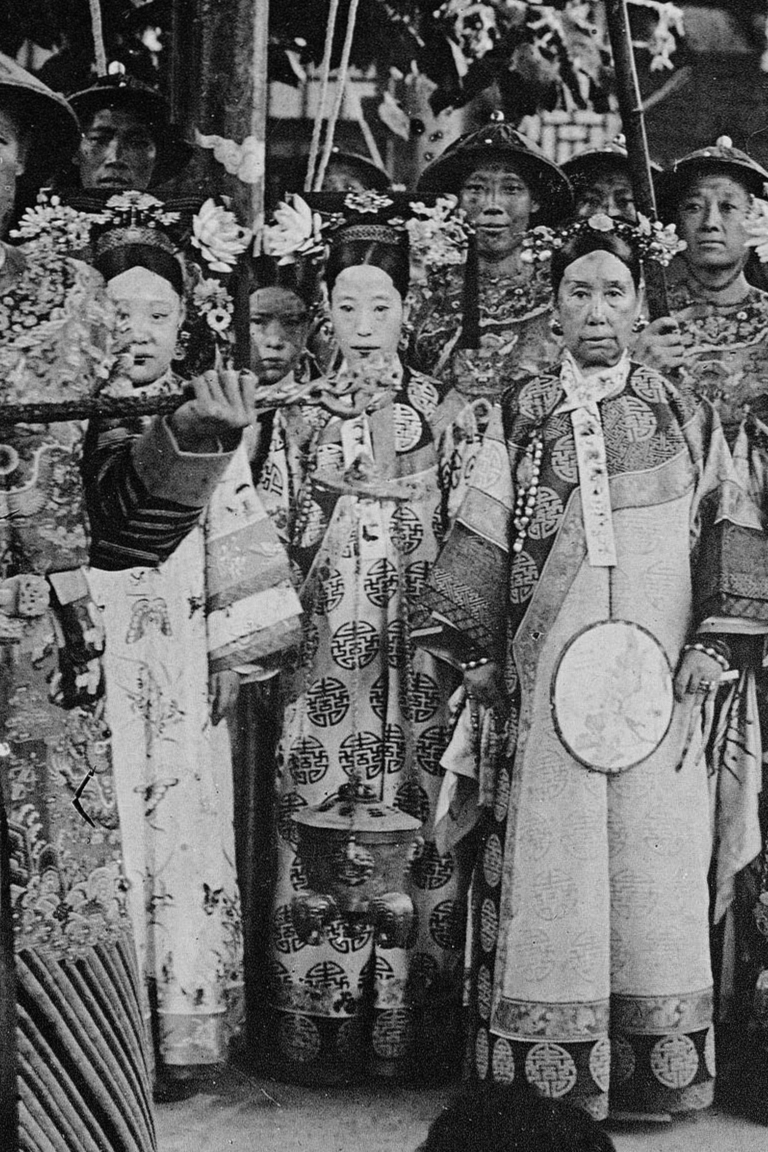
- Qing Empress dowager Cixi (right) and Empress Longyu (middle) wearing longhua collar, Qing dynasty,1900.
- Traditional Chinese: 龍華
- Simplified Chinese: 龙华
Transcriptions
Standard Mandarin
- Hanyu Pinyin: Lónghuá

Alternative Chinese name
- Chinese: 龙华领巾
Transcriptions
Standard Mandarin
- Hanyu Pinyin: Lónghuá lǐngjīn

Longhua (龍華) were white, scarf-like collars worn by Manchu women in the early to mid-Qing dynasty. It was worn all year around when robes without collar were worn.

== History ==
Robes and jackets in the Qing dynasty were generally round-necked. Clothing with high collars or neckbands already existed since the late Ming dynasty, however, in Qing, high collar clothing were only worn on an occasional basis. Detachable collars were therefore produced and sold separately from the garments. They were then used for decorative purposes, for keeping its wearer warm and in formal official attire. During the late Qing, the high collar was eventually integrated to both the clothing of the Chinese and the Manchu as standard features. With the rise of collars in garments, longhua slowly disappeared in use.

== Gallery ==
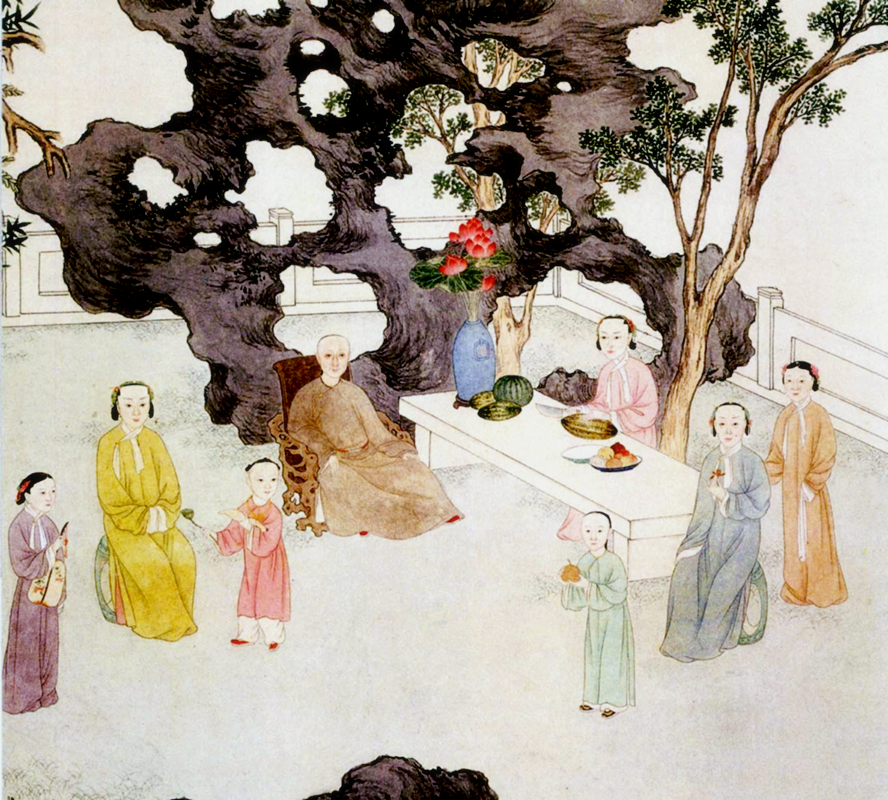
Painting of a Manchurian Family, 1800.

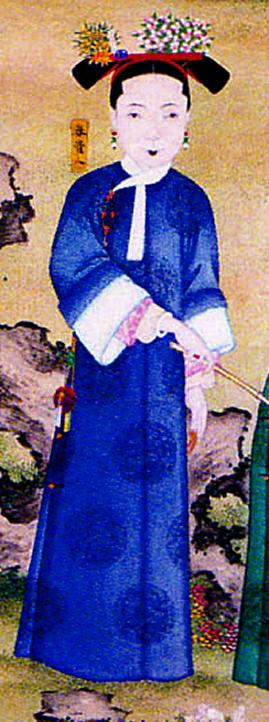
Imperial portrait of the Worthy Lady Chun of Emperor Xianfeng wearing longhua, mid 1800s.

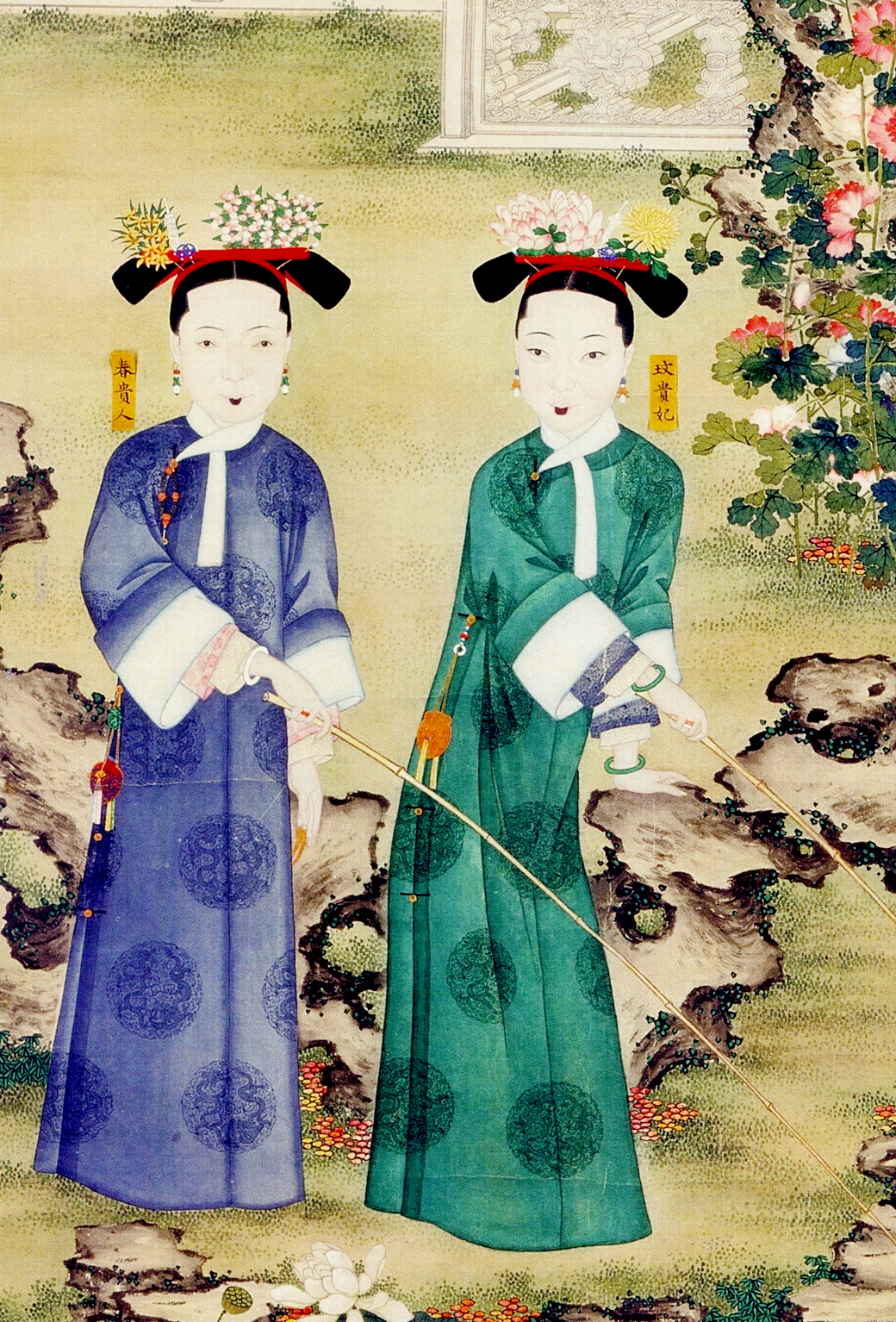
Concubines of the Xianfeng Emperor fishing at a pond.

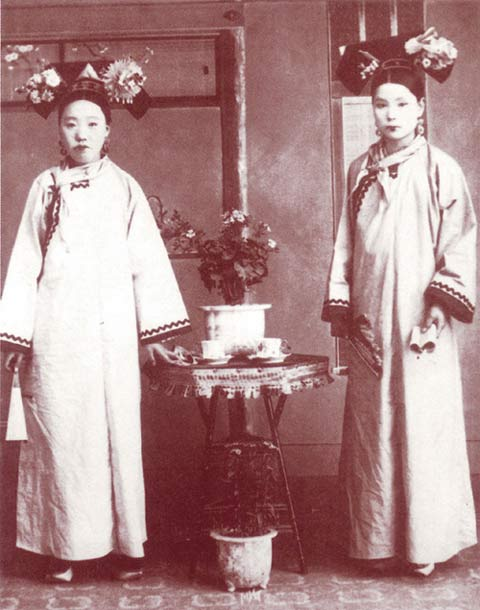
Two ladies of Qing Chinese Imperial Court wearing longhua with Qizhuang, pre-1911.

== See also ==
- Chaozhu (Court necklace)
- Mandarin collar
- Yunjian
- Yupei
