= Necklace =

Jewellery worn around the neck

- Location: Neck
- Jewelry: Pendant; Chain; Tennis; Station; Choker (14–16 inches); Lariat; Statement

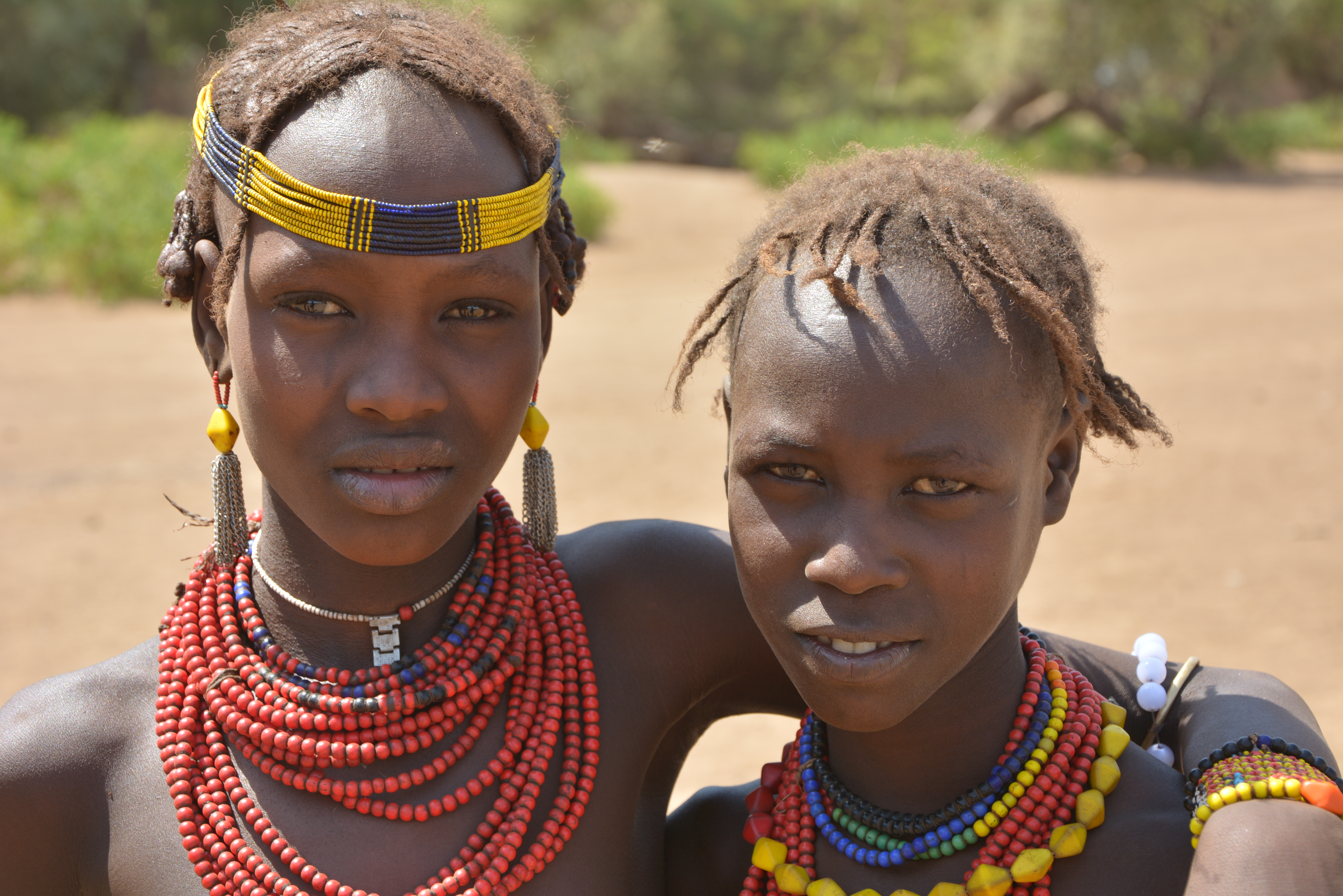
Daasanach girls wearing necklaces

A necklace is an article of jewellery that is worn around the neck. Necklaces may have been one of the earliest types of adornment worn by humans. They often serve ceremonial, religious, magical, or funerary purposes and are also used as symbols of wealth and status, given that they are commonly made of precious metals and stones.

The main component of a necklace is the band, chain, or cord that wraps around the neck. It is most often rendered in precious metals such as gold, silver, and platinum. Necklaces often have additional attachments suspended or inset into the necklace itself. These attachments typically include pendants, lockets, amulets, crosses, and precious and semiprecious materials such as diamond, pearls, rubies, emeralds, garnets, and sapphires. They are made with many different type of materials and are used for many things and sometimes classified as clothing.

== Historical necklaces ==
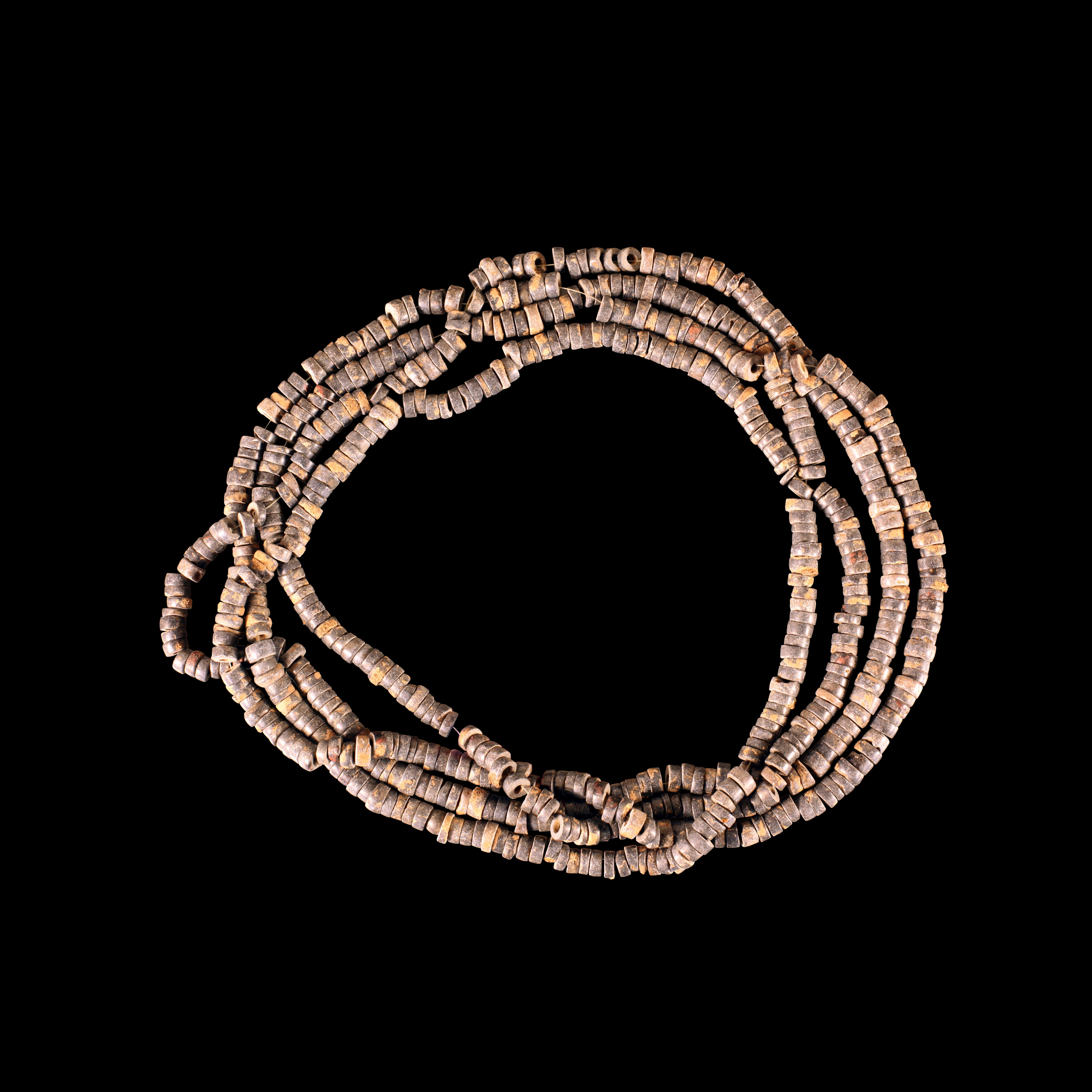
Neolithic Talc Necklace

=== Prehistoric neckware ===
Prehistoric peoples often used natural materials such as feathers, bone, shells, and plant materials to create necklaces. Evidence of early Upper Paleolithic necklace making in southern Africa and east Africa dates back to 50,000 BP. By the Bronze Age metallic jewellery had replaced pre-metallic adornments. Necklaces were first depicted in statuary and art of the Ancient Near East, and early necklaces made of precious metals with inset stones were created in Europe.

=== Ancient civilizations ===
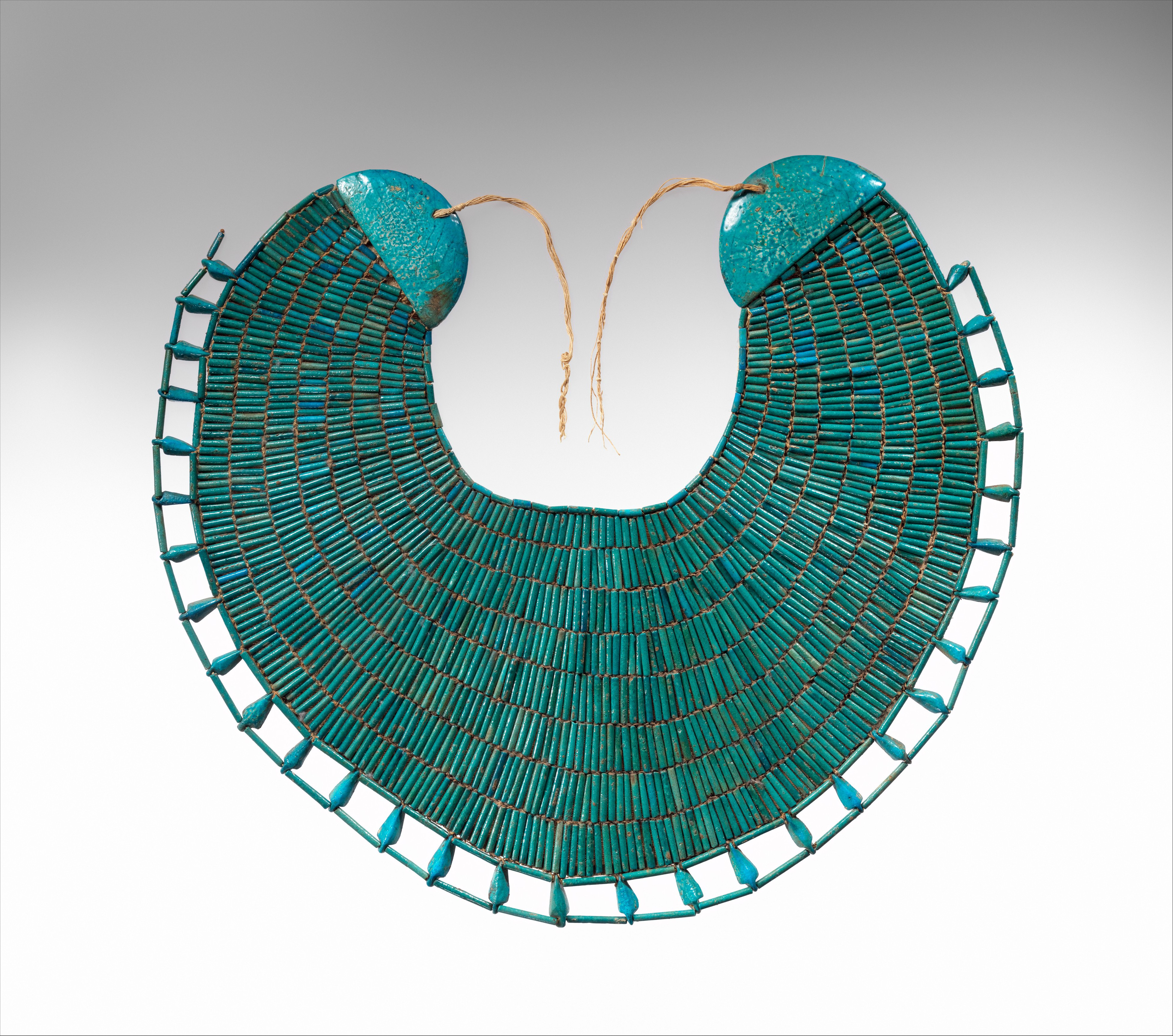
Broad collar beaded Egyptian necklace of the 12th dynasty official Wah from his Theban tomb

In Ancient Mesopotamia, cylinder seals were often strung and worn as jewellery. In Ancient Babylon, necklaces were made of carnelian, lapis lazuli, agate, and gold, which was also made into gold chains. Ancient Sumerians created necklaces and beads from gold, silver, lapis lazuli and carnelian.

In Ancient Egypt, a number of different necklace types were worn. Upper-class Ancient Egyptians wore collars of organic or semi-precious and precious materials for religious, celebratory, and funerary purposes. These collars were often ornamented with semi-precious, glass, pottery, and hollow beads. Beads made from a variety of precious and semi-precious materials were also commonly strung together to create necklaces. Gold that was fashioned into stylised plant, animal, and insect shapes were common as well. Amulets were also turned into necklaces.

In Ancient Crete necklaces were worn by all classes; peasants wore stones on flax thread while the wealthy wore beads of agate, pearl, carnelian, amethyst, and rock crystal. Pendants shaped into birds, animals, and humans were also worn, in addition to paste beads.

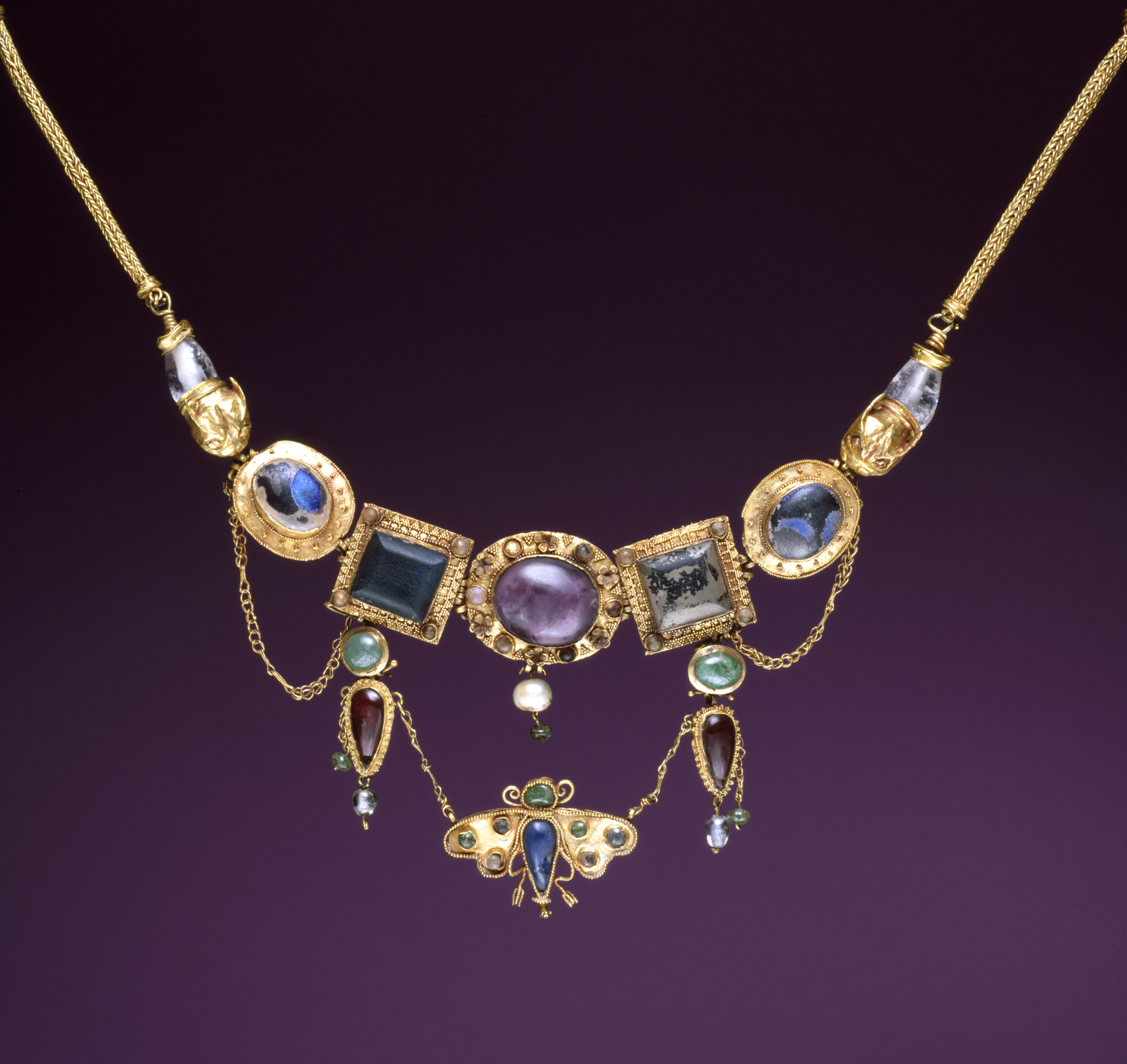
A polychromatic Greek necklace with butterfly Krishna Roy pendant

In Ancient Greece, delicately made gold necklaces created with repoussé and plaited gold wires were worn. Most often these necklaces were ornamented with blue or green enameled rosettes, animal shapes, or vase-shaped pendants that were often detailed with fringes. It was also common to wear long gold chains with suspended cameos and small containers of perfume. New elements were introduced in the Hellenistic period; colored stones allowed for poly-chromatic pieces, and animal-head finials and spear-like or bud shaped pendants were hung from chains. Ancient Etruscans used granulation to create granulated gold beads which were strung with glass and faience beads to create colorful necklaces.

In Ancient Rome necklaces were among the many types of jewellery worn by the Roman elite. Gold and silver necklaces were often ornamented with foreign and semi-precious objects such as amber, pearl, amethyst, sapphire, and diamond. In addition, ropes of pearls, gold plates inset with enamel, and lustrous stones set in gold filigree were often worn. Many large necklaces and the materials that adorned the necklaces were imported from the Near East.

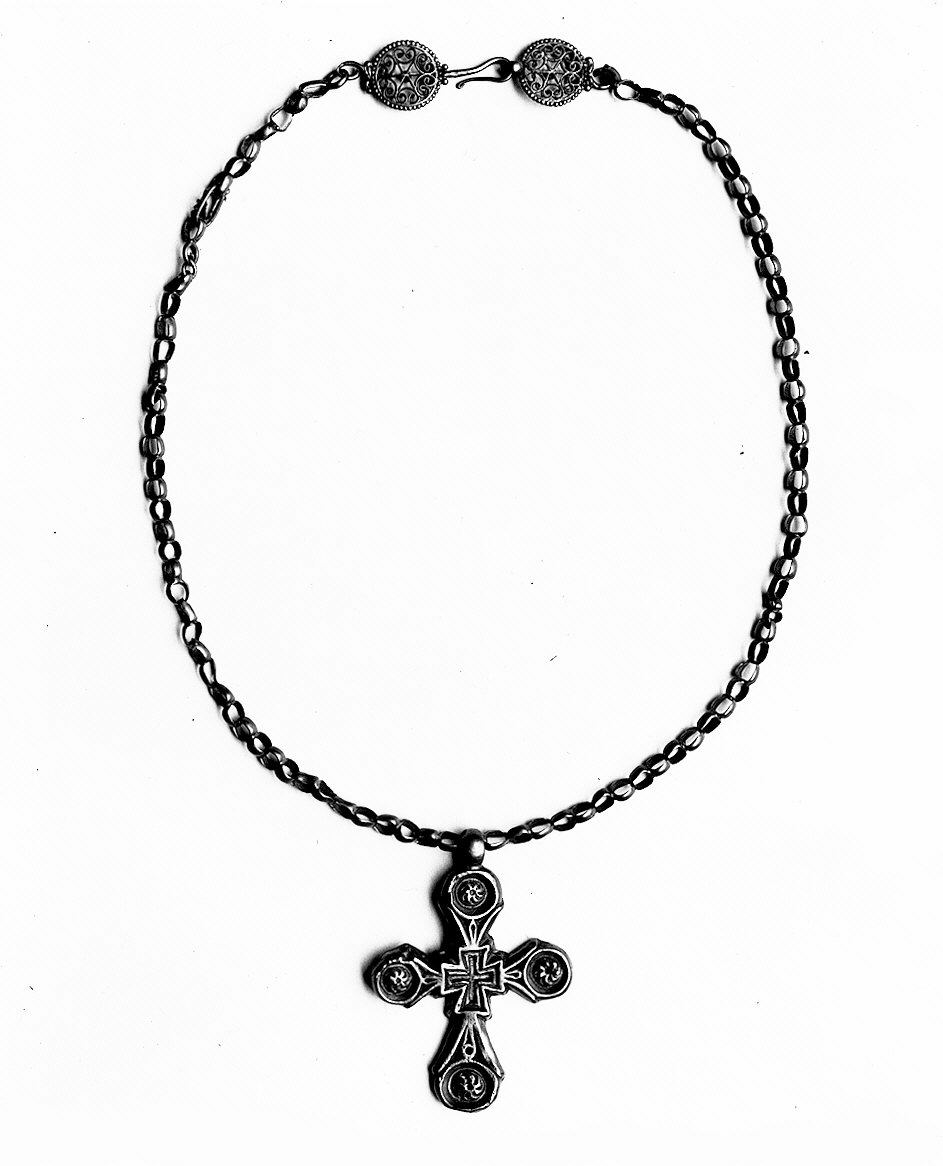
Byzantine Christian cross necklace

Later in the empire, following barbarian invasions, colorful and gaudy jewellery became popular. In the Byzantine era, ropes of pearls and embossed gold chains were most often worn, but new techniques such as the use of niello allowed for necklaces with brighter, more predominant gemstones. The Early Byzantine Era also saw a shift to distinctly Christian jewellery which displayed the new Christian iconography.

=== Timeline of non-classical European necklaces ===
2000 BC – AD 400: Bronze amulets embossed with coral were common. In Celtic and Gallic Europe, the most popular necklace was the heavy metal torc, made most often out of bronze, but sometimes out of silver, gold, or glass or amber beads.

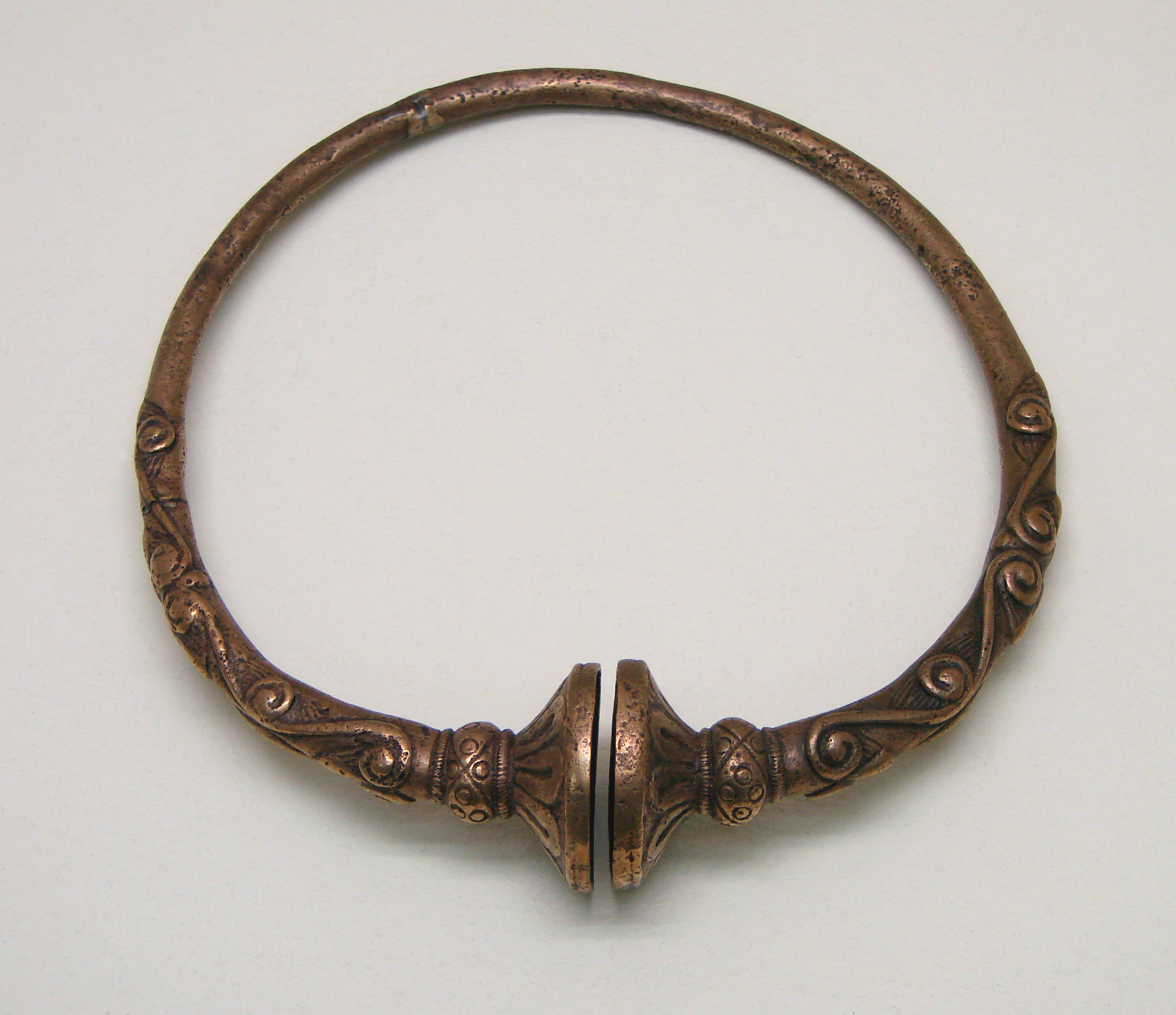
Bronze 4th-century BC buffer-type torc from France

AD 400 – 1300: Early European barbarian groups favored wide, intricate gold collars not unlike the torc. Germanic tribes often wore gold and silver pieces with complex detailing and inlaid with colored glass and semi-precious stones, especially garnet. Anglo-Saxon and Scandinavian groups worked mainly in silver, due to a deficit of gold, and wrought patterns and animal forms into neck-rings. In the Gothic period necklaces were uncommon, though there are a few records of diamond, ruby, and pearl necklaces. It was not until the adoption of lower necklines later in the Middle Ages that necklaces became common.

1400–1500: During the Renaissance it was fashionable for men to wear a number of chains, plaques, and pendants around their necks, and by the end of the 15th century the wealthiest men would wear great, shoulder covering collars inlaid with gems. Women typically wore simpler pieces, such as gold chains, or strung beads or pearls. By the end of the period, larger, more heavily adorned pieces were common among the wealthy, particularly in Italy.

1500–1600: Long pearl ropes and chains with precious stones were commonly worn. In the latter half of the century, natural adornments, such as coral and pearl, were joined with enamel and metals to create intricate pendants. Heavily jeweled, delicately framed cameo pendants were popular as well. Chokers, last worn commonly in antiquity, also made a resurgence at this time.

1600–1700: Few men in the Baroque period wore jewellery, and for women necklaces were unsophisticated, often a simple strand of pearls or delicately linked and embellished strands of metal with small stones. Later in the century, after the invention of new diamond cutting techniques, priority was for the first time given to the jewels themselves, not their settings; it was common for jewels to be pinned to black velvet ribbons. Miniatures also grew in popularity, and were often made into portrait pendants or lockets.

1700–1800: Portrait pendants were still worn, and in extravagantly jeweled settings. The newly wealthy bourgeoisie delighted in jewellery, and the new imitation stones and imitation gold allowed them more access to the necklaces of the time. In the early part of the century, the dominant styles were a velvet ribbon with suspended pendants and the rivière necklace, a single row of large precious stones. By mid-century colorful, whimsical necklaces made of real and imitation gems were popular, and the end of the century saw a neo-Classical resurgence. In the Age of Enlightenment gowns often featured a neck ruffle which women accented with neck ribbons rather than traditional necklaces, but some women did wear chokers inlaid with rubies and diamonds. Seed pearls were introduced to the United States during the Federalist Era, leading to an increase in lacy pearl necklaces.

1800–1870: The low necklines of the court gowns fashionable at this time led to the use of large necklaces set with precious jewels. In Napoleon's court that ancient Greek style was fashionable, and women wore strands of pearls or gold chains with cameos and jewels. In the Romantic period necklaces were extravagant: it was fashionable to wear a tight, gem-encrusted collar with matching jewel pendants attached and rosettes of gems with pearl borders. It was also common to wear jeweled brooches attached to neck ribbons. Some necklaces were made to be dismantled and reconfigured into a shorter necklace, brooches, and a bracelet. Highly embellished Gothic style necklaces from England reflected the crenelations, vertical lines and high relief of the cathedrals. Empress Eugénie popularised bare décolletage with multiple necklaces on the throat, shoulders, and bosom. There was also an interest in antiquity; mosaic jewellery and Roman and Greek necklaces were reproduced. Machine-made jewellery and electroplating allowed for an influx of inexpensive imitation necklaces.

1870–1910: The Edwardian era saw a resurgence of pearl necklaces, in addition to a dog-collar style of necklace made of gold or platinum with inset diamonds, emeralds, or rubies. The Art Nouveau movement inspired symbolic, abstract designs with natural and animal motifs. The materials used – glass, porcelain, bronze, ivory, mother of pearl, horn, and enamel – were not used for their value, but for their appearance.

1910–1970: Chanel popularised costume jewellery, and ropes of glass beads were common. The Art Deco movement created chunky, geometric jewellery that combined multiple types of gems and steel. By the 1960s costume jewellery was widely worn, which resulted in seasonal, ever-changing styles of necklaces and other jewellery. Fine jewellery that was common in this period included wholly geometric or organically shaped silver necklaces, and precious gems set in platinum or gold necklaces inspired by the time of the French Empire. Love beads (a single strand of stone or glass beads) and pendant necklaces (most often made of leather cords or metal chains with metal pendants) became popular and were worn mostly by men.

== East Asia ==
=== China ===
==== Chaozhu ====
Chaozhu
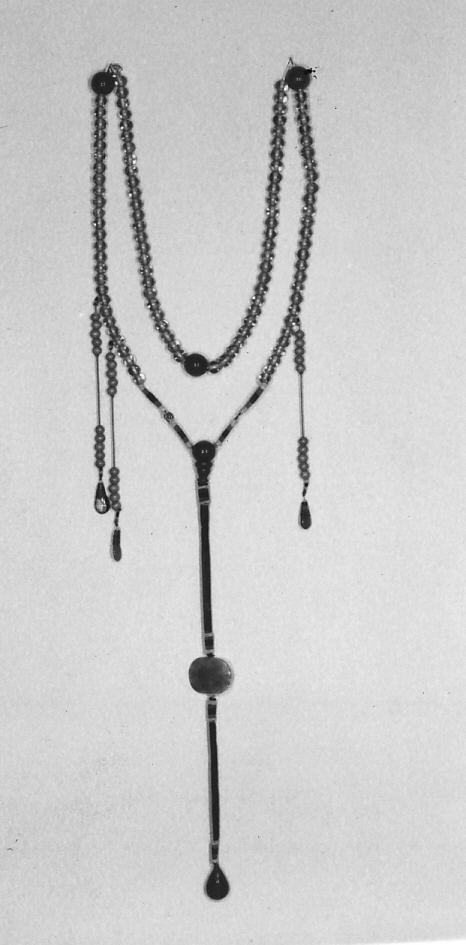
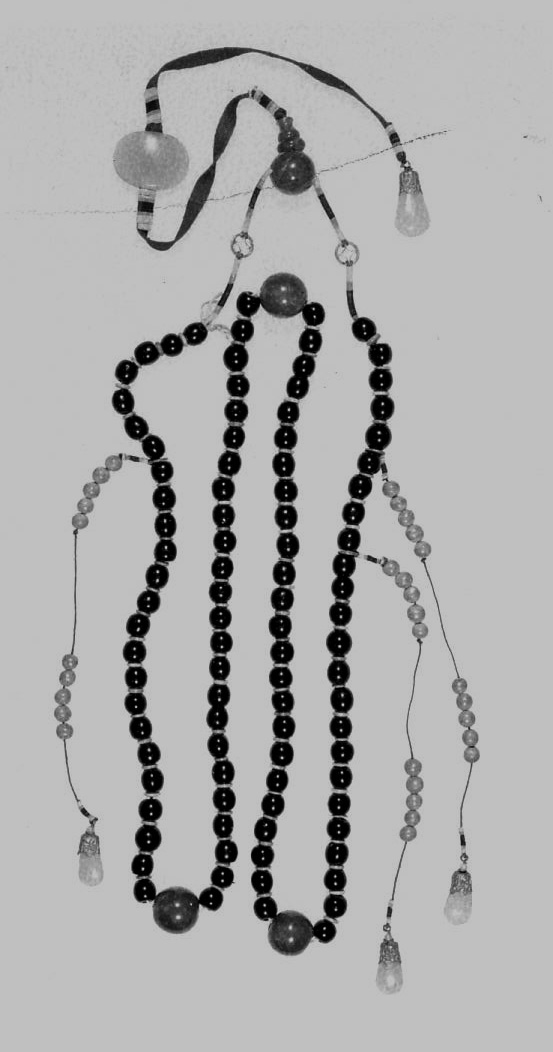
Court necklace of the Qing dynasty

In Qing dynasty China, a court necklace called chaozhu (Chinese: 朝珠), was worn by the Qing dynasty emperors and other members of the imperial family. The court necklace originated from a Buddhist rosary sent in 1643 by the Dalai Lama to the first emperor of the Qing dynasty. The necklace is composed of 108 small beads, with 4 large beads of contrasting stones to symbolize the 4 seasons, and was placed between groups of 27 beads. The necklace was also practical as it could be used for mathematical calculations in the absence of an abacus.

==== Necklace with longevity lock pendant ====
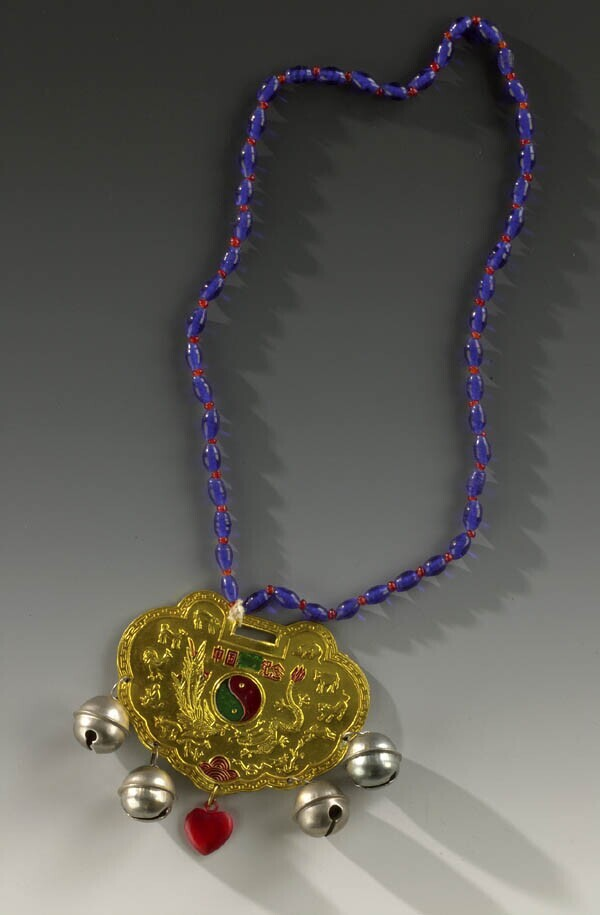
Chinese necklace with longevity lock

In China, there is a custom of wearing a necklace with a longevity lock pendant. These lock charms were sometimes personally tied around the necks of children by Buddhist or Taoist priests. The longevity lock is known as changmingsuo (lit. 'longevity lock') and is an important form of amulet for children for thousand of years in Chinese culture. According to Chinese beliefs, the changmingsuo protect children from evil spirits and bad luck by locking its wearer's soul and life inside of the lock. The changmingsuo is often made with precious materials, such as gold, silver, and jade, and having auspicious words carved on it. This form of necklace continues to be worn in present-days China.

==== Yingluo ====
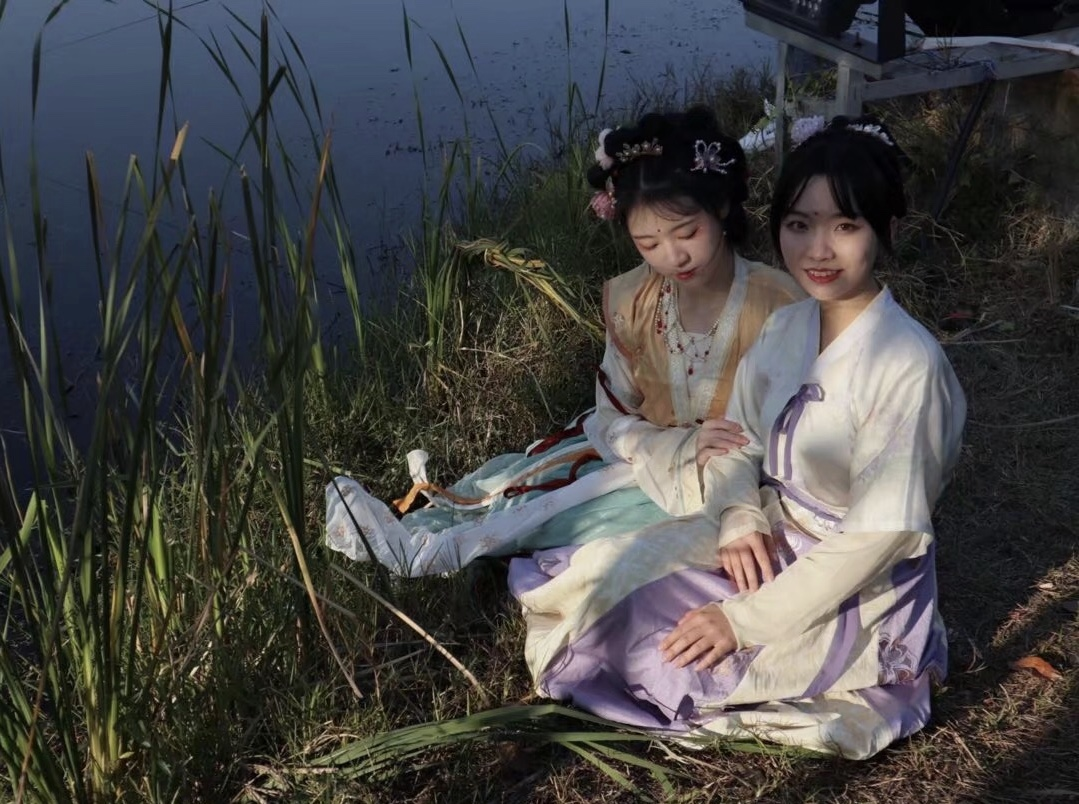
Girl wearing a Hanfu and a modern-style, pearl yingluo (left), 2021

Yingluo (simplified Chinese: 璎珞; traditional Chinese: 瓔珞) was a ring-like neck ornament or fashionable necklace which was originally a Buddhist ornament depicted in Buddhist arts (e.g. sculptures and paintings) in China; the yingluo have roots in ancient India where its earlier prototype is the Indian ornament keyūra. The depictions of the keyūra was introduced in China along with Buddhism. The depictions of yingluo in China, such as those found in Dunhuang, evolved in shape and styles showing the cultural integration of foreign (non-Chinese) culture and the native Chinese culture due to the special characteristics of its geography.

The yingluo eventually evolved from an ornament in Buddhist arts and eventually became an actual necklace by the Tang dynasty. The yingluo then became a classical form of necklace in Chinese society throughout centuries. It continues to be worn in present-day, especially as a common hanfu accessory being used by Hanfu enthusiasts since the Hanfu Movement. It comes in variety of styles, shapes, and materials.

== Oceania ==
=== Tasmania ===
==== Shell necklaces ====
Aboriginal Tasmanian women have been making shell necklaces from maireener (Phasianotrochus irisodontes) shells for at least 2,600 years, with some major collections in museums. The continuation of the practice is being threatened by reducing supply, and sixth-generation Palawa woman Lola Greeno is concerned that the practice will die out.

== Necklace lengths ==
Necklaces are typically classified by length:

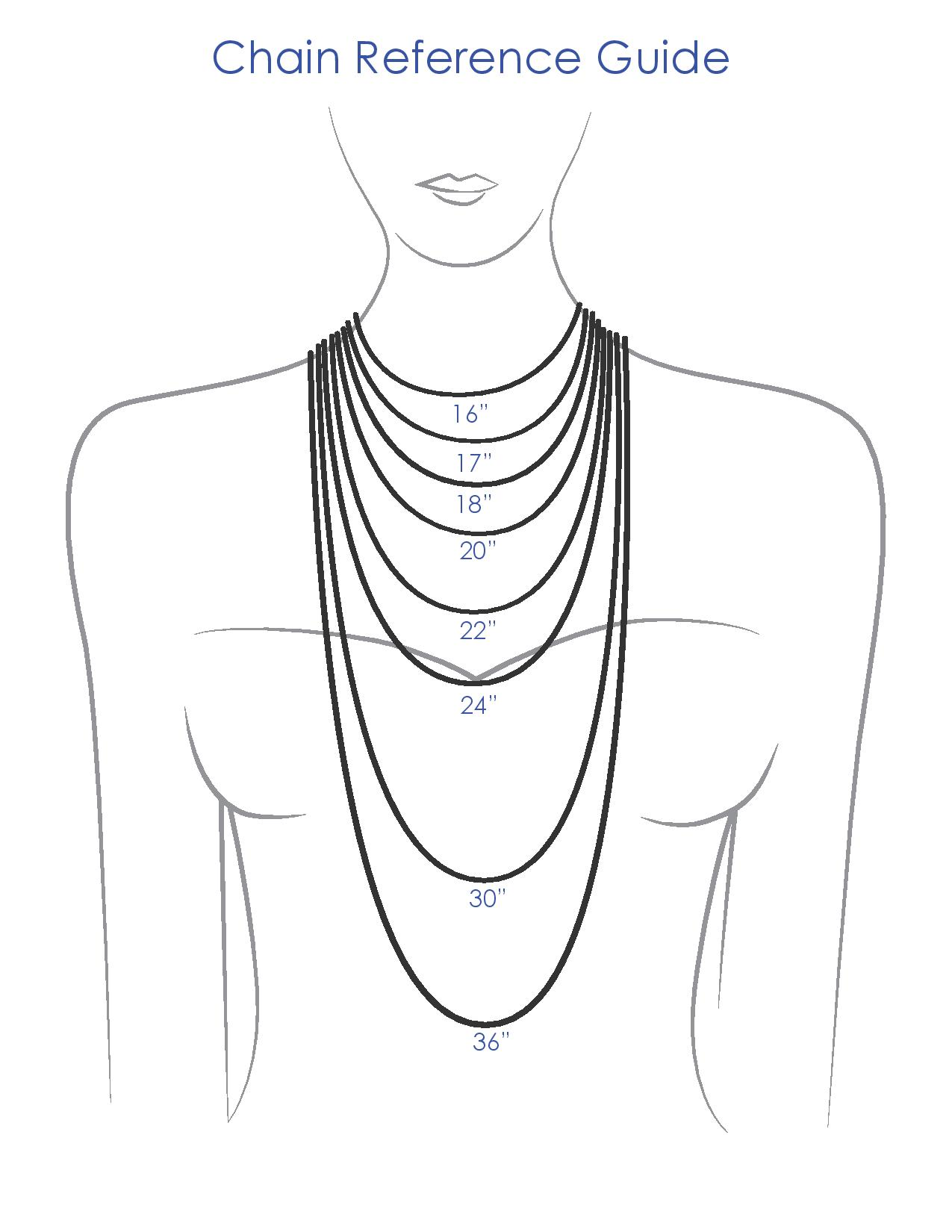
Necklace length diagram

Choker
Close-fitting, short, About 30~33 centimetres (12~13-inch) long and sits high on the neck.
Collar
35~41 centimetres (14~16 in) long.
Princess necklace
45~50 centimetres (18~20 in) long.
Matinee necklace
56~58 centimetres (22~23 in) long.
Opera necklace
~75 centimetres (~30 in) long and sits below the bust.
Rope/Lariat necklace
Any longer than opera length (~33+ in)
Sits at the waist, and often can be worn wrapped and draped multiple times around the neck.

== Different types of necklaces ==
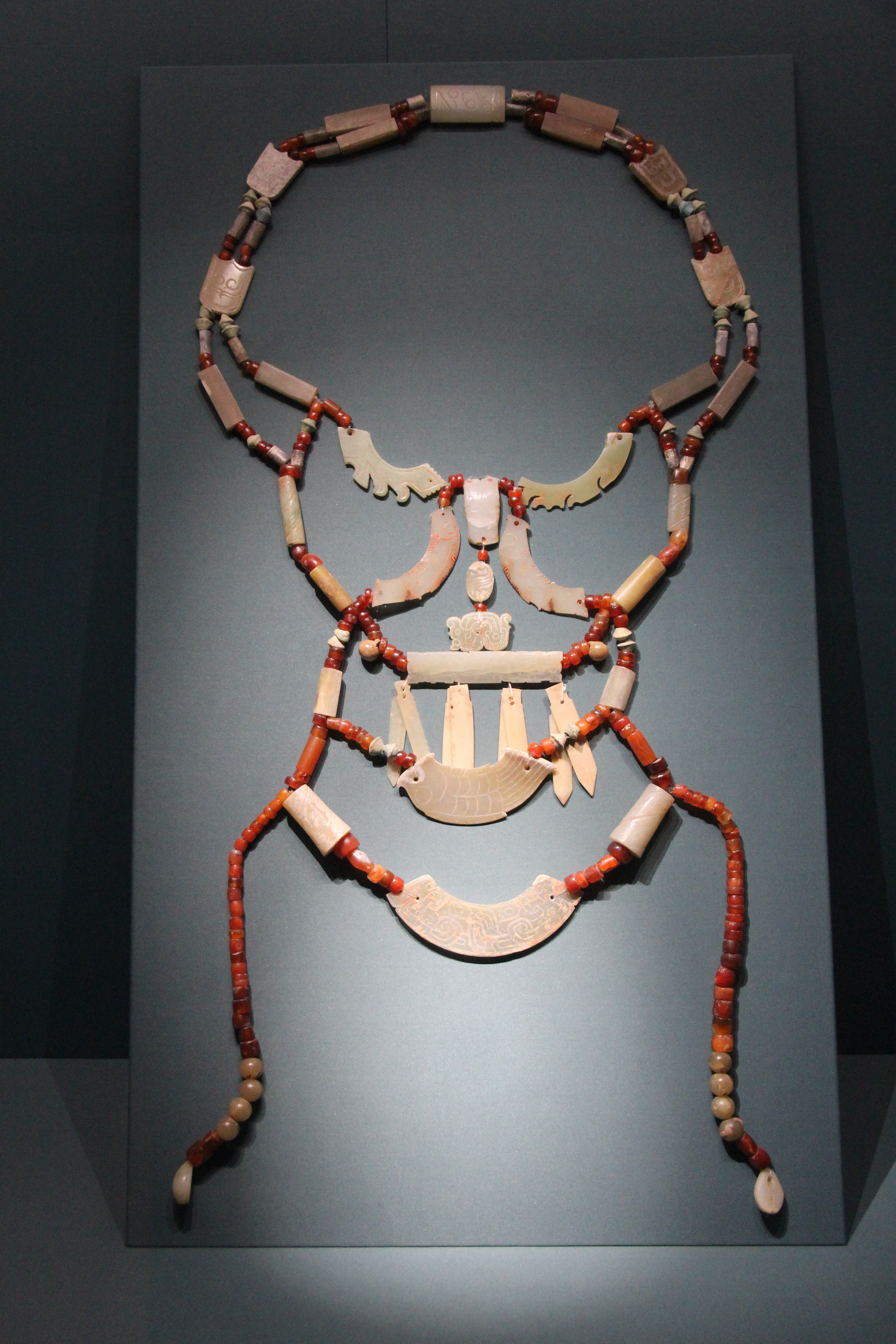
Necklace, Late Zhou dynasty (c.1046 to 256 BC), China

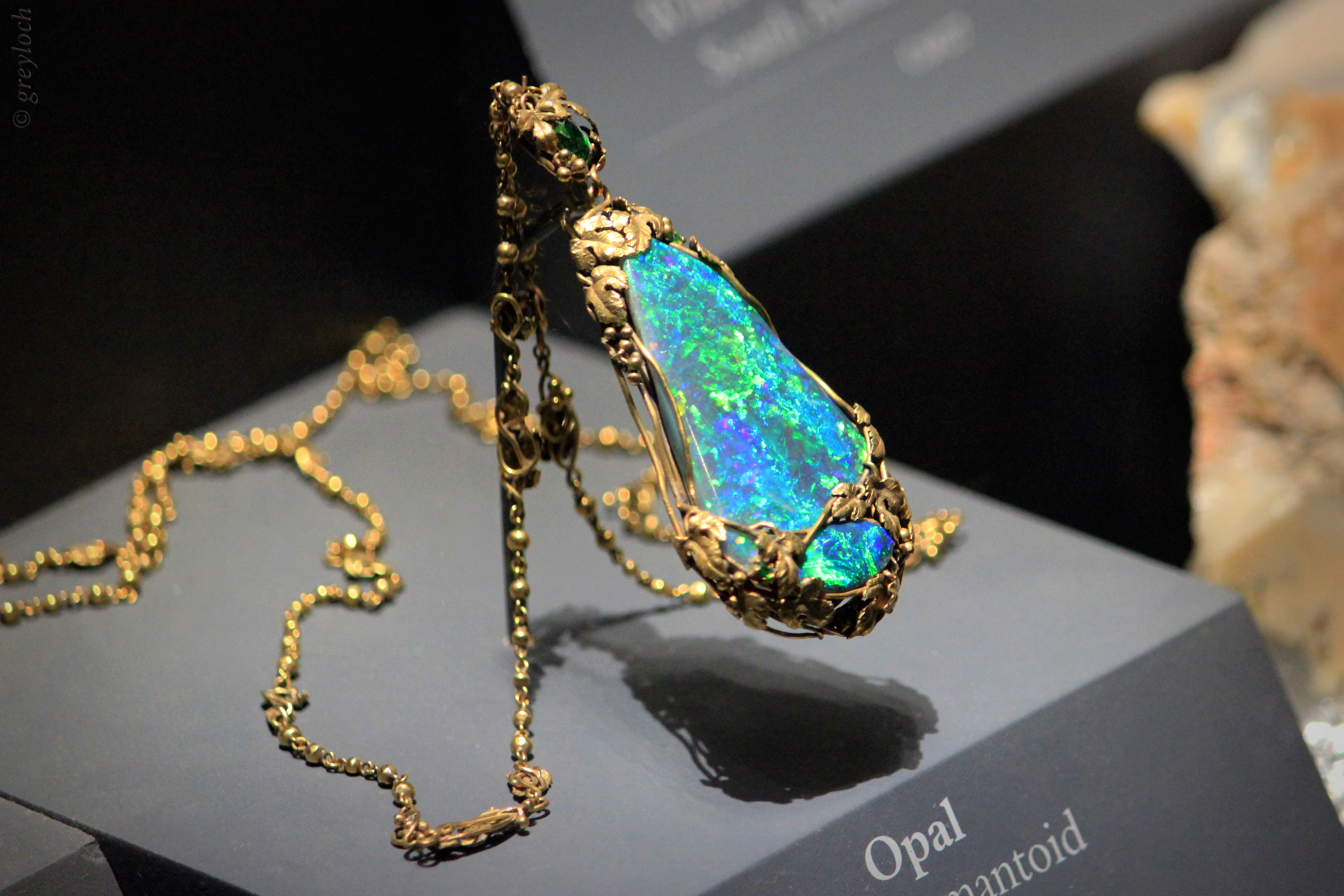
Tiffany Opal Necklace

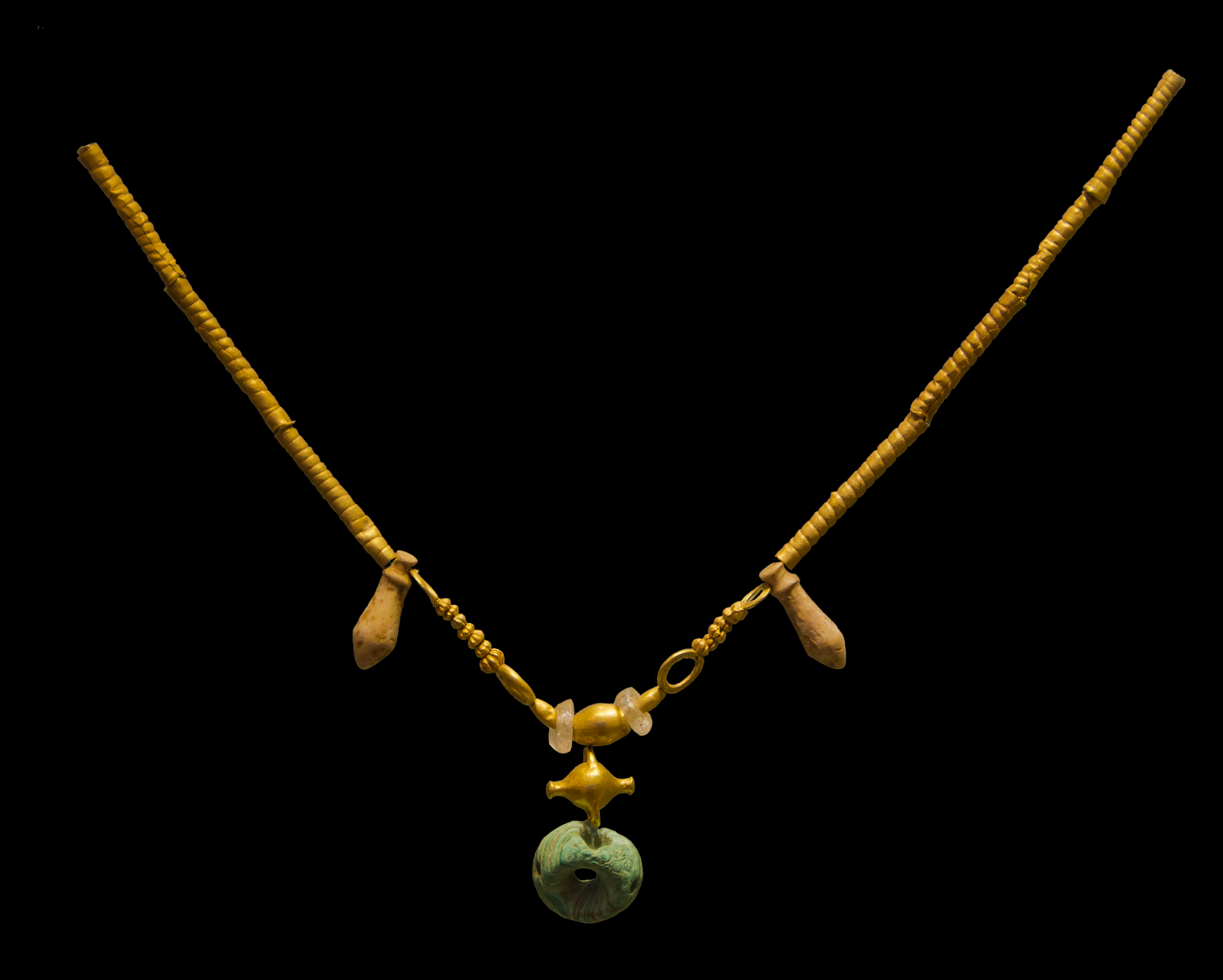
Minoan Gold Necklace (Archmus Heraklion)

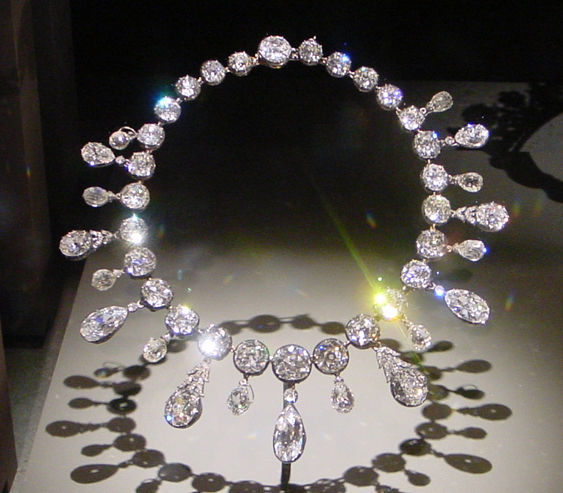
Napoleonic-era Diamond Necklace

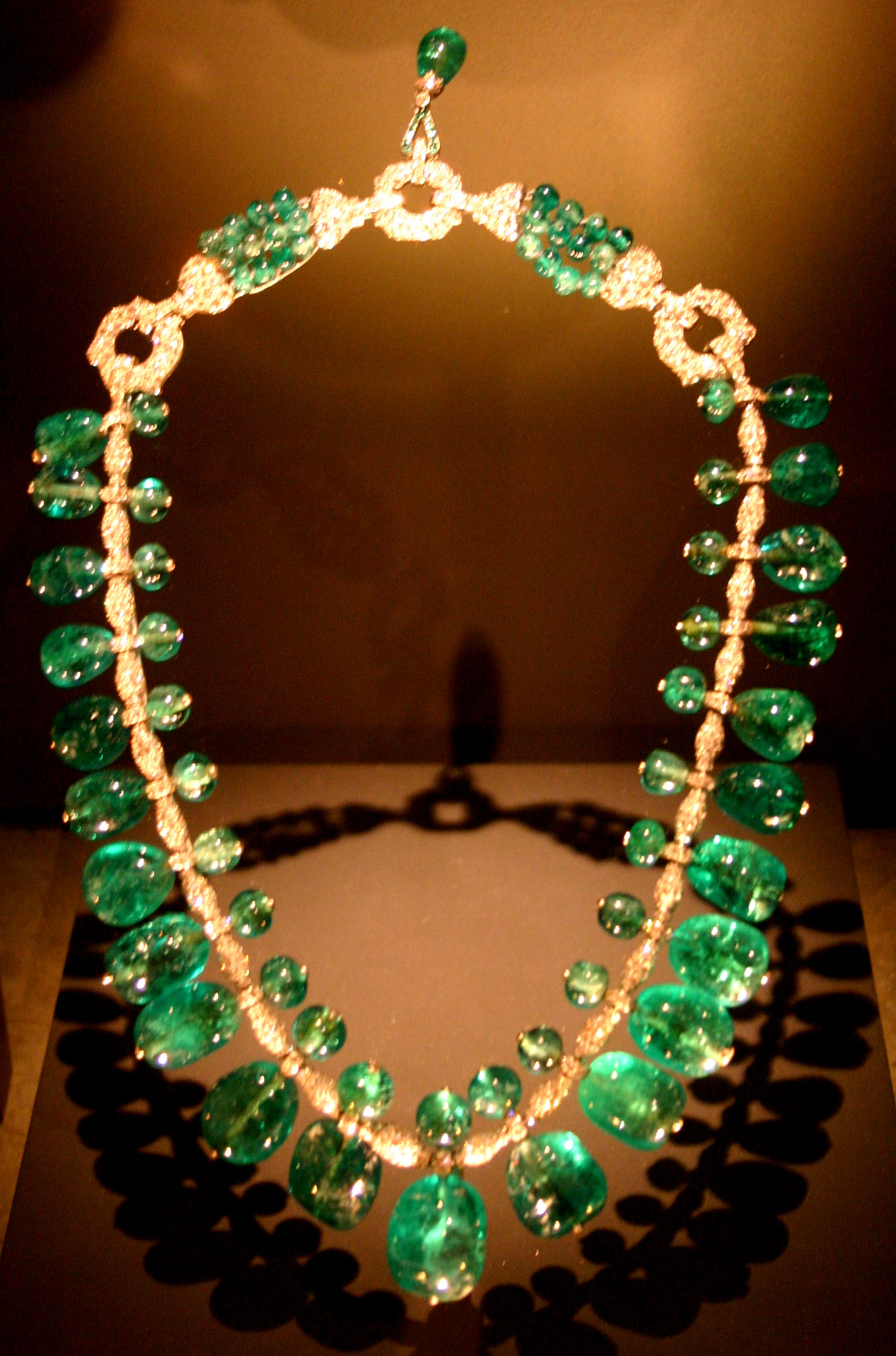
Emerald Necklace

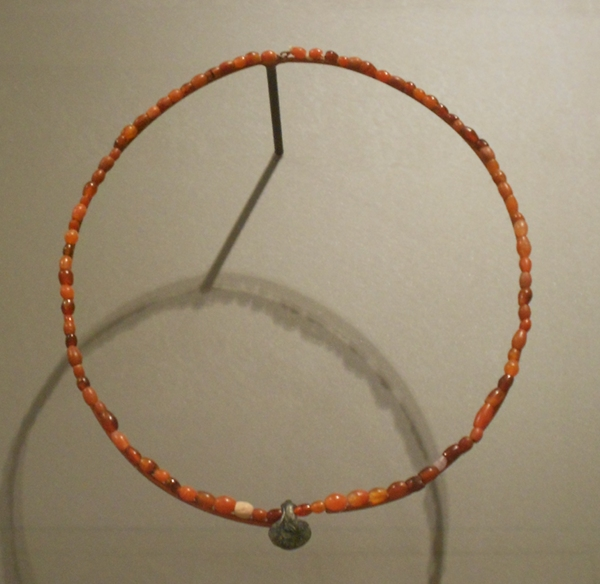
Carnelian, Limestone, and Quartz Egyptian necklace

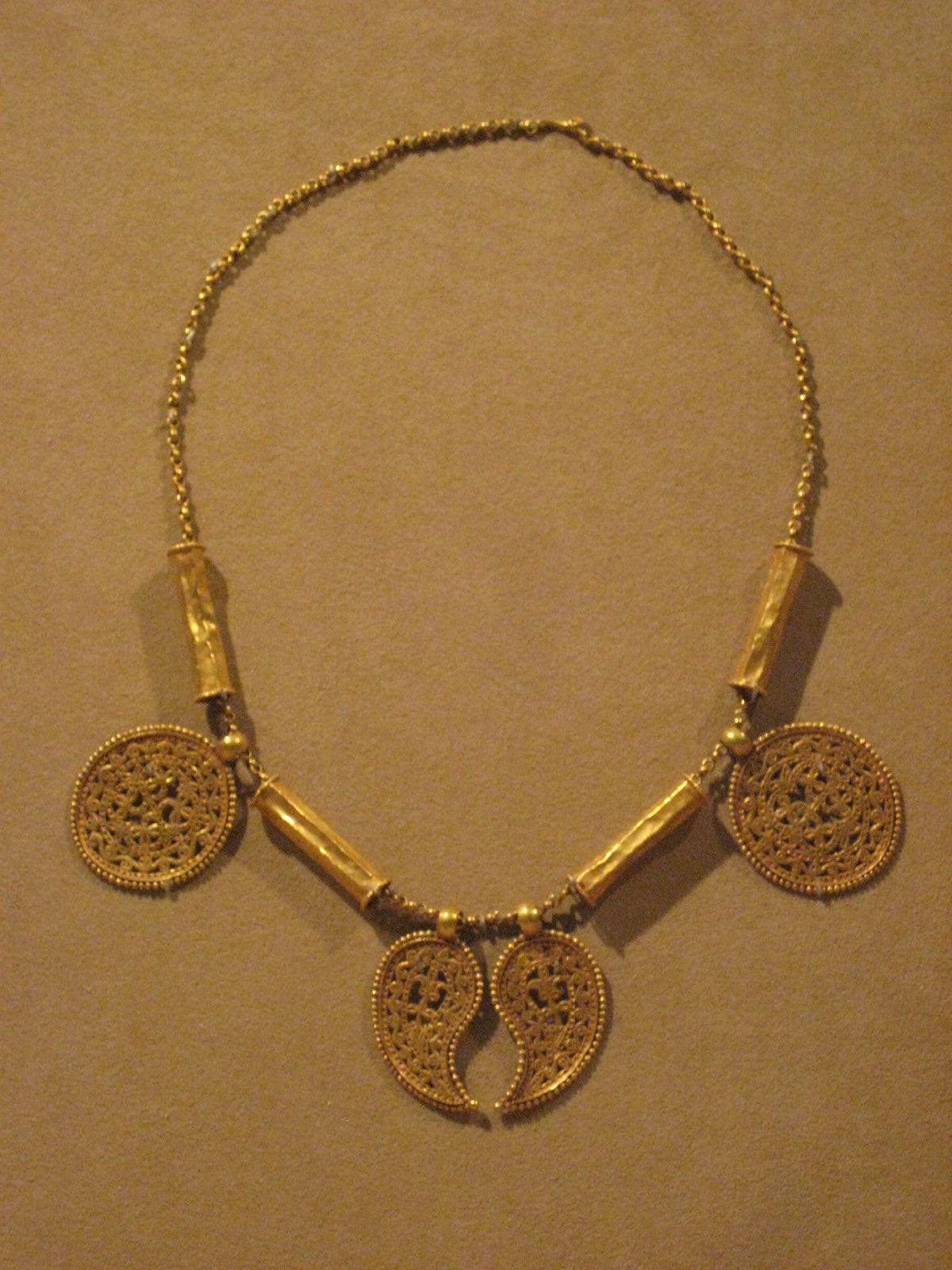
Gold Ancient Byzantine Necklace with Pendants

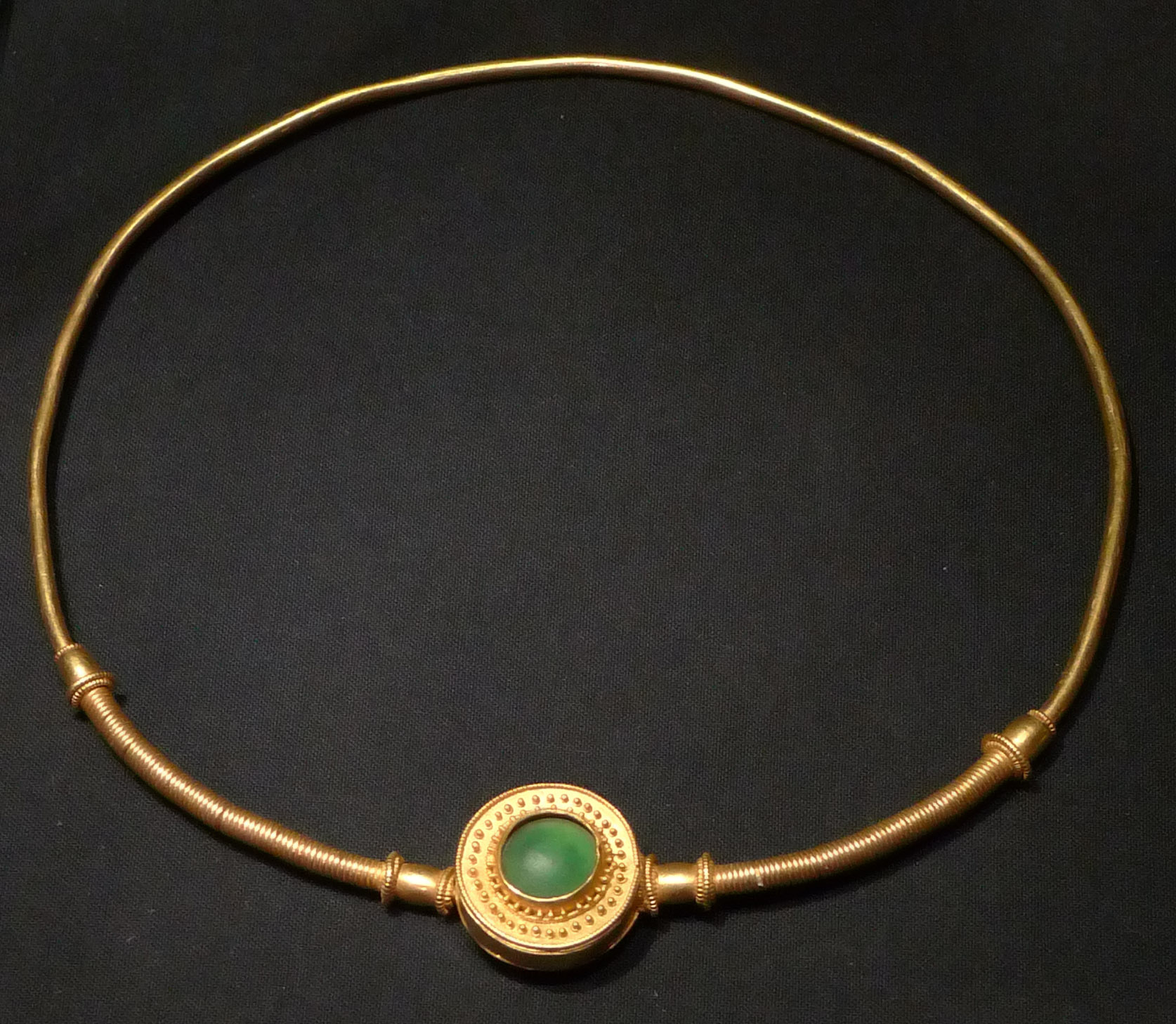
Gold and Glass Vandal necklace, c. AD 300

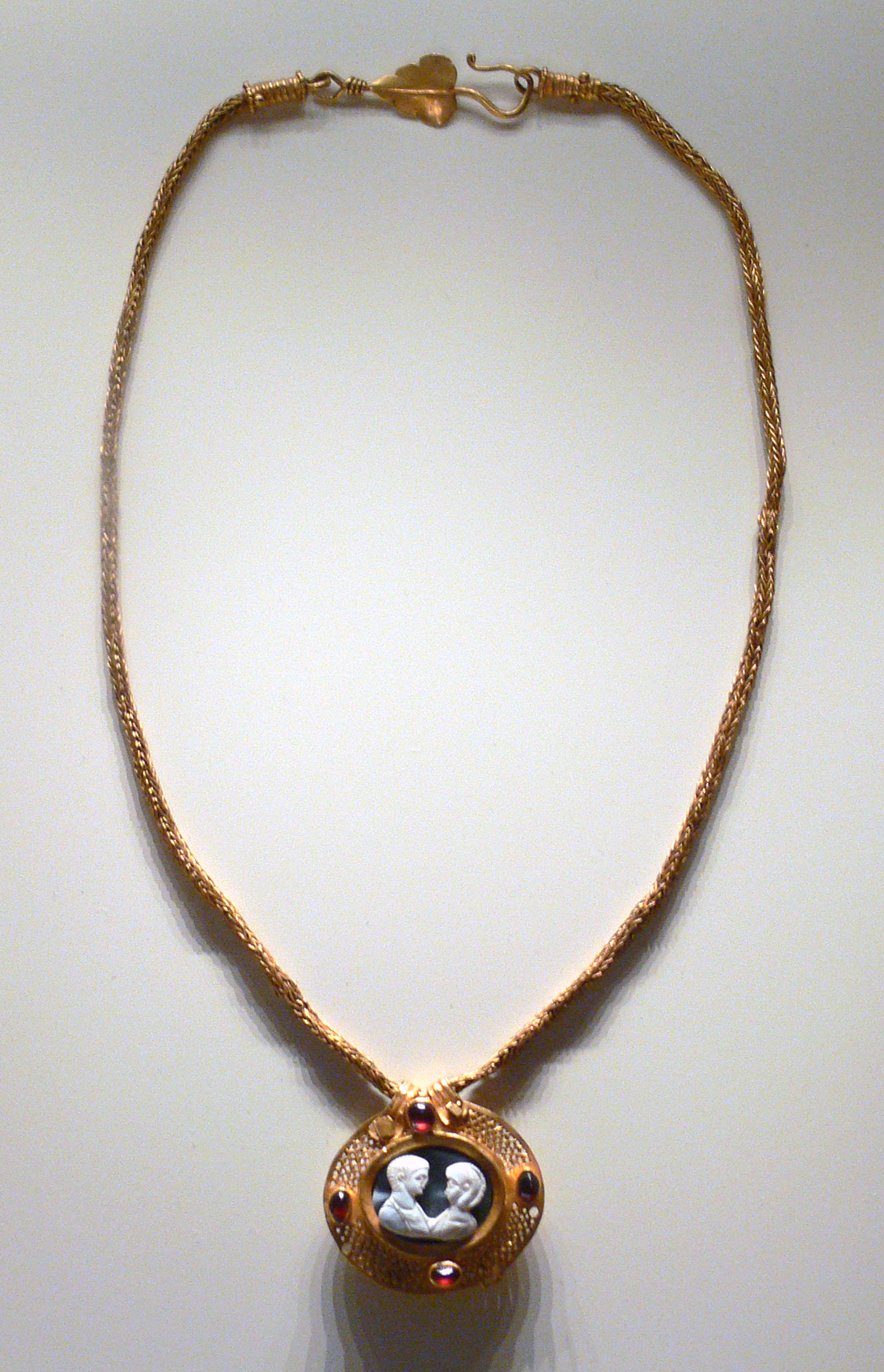
Necklace with Relief Pendant

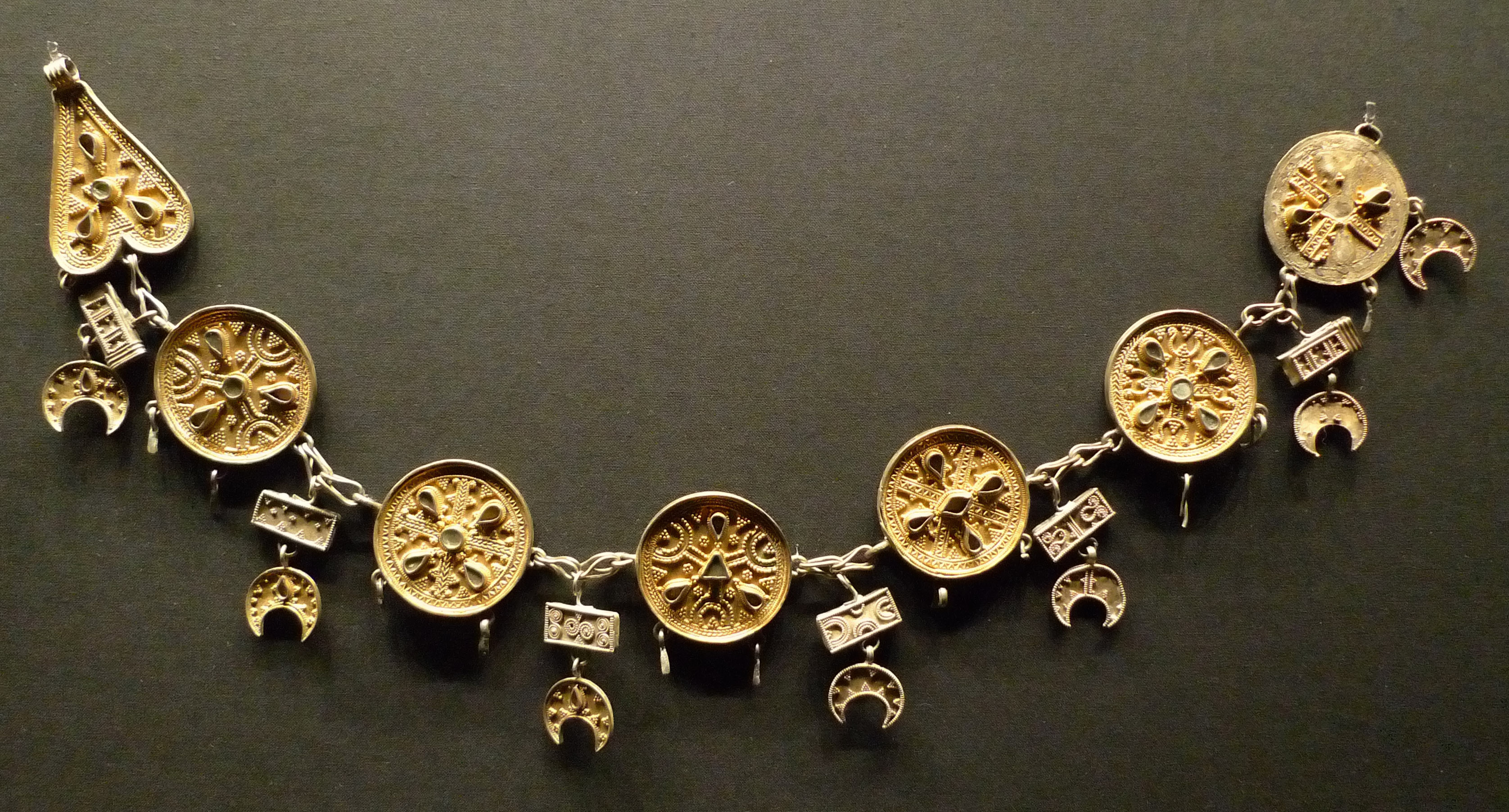
Silver necklace, c. AD 600-650

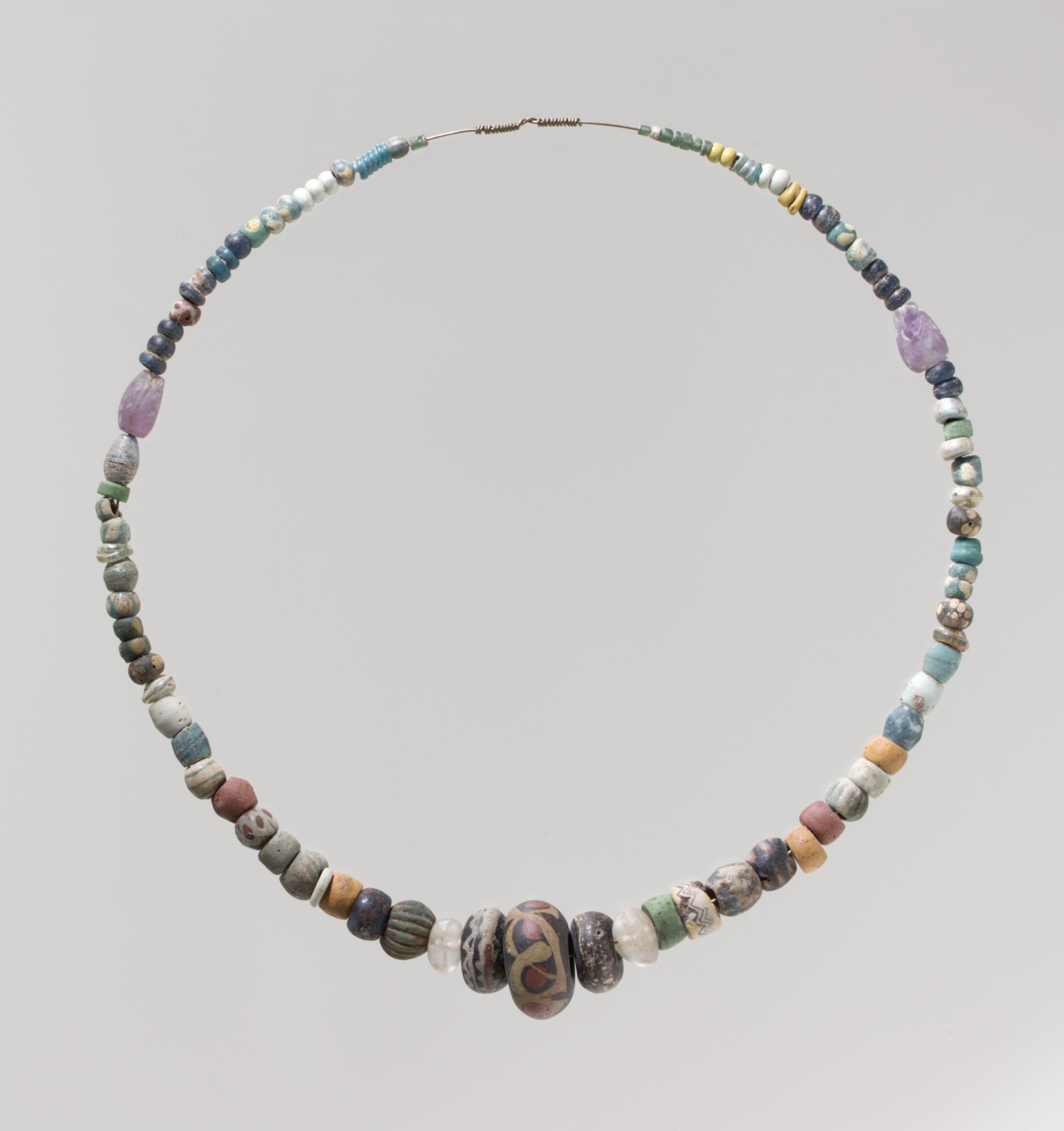
Frankish Glass Bead Necklace

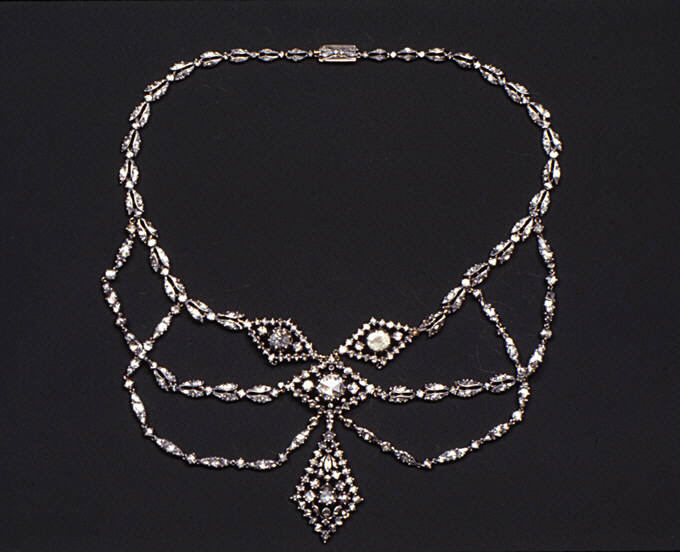
Gold and Platinum Necklace

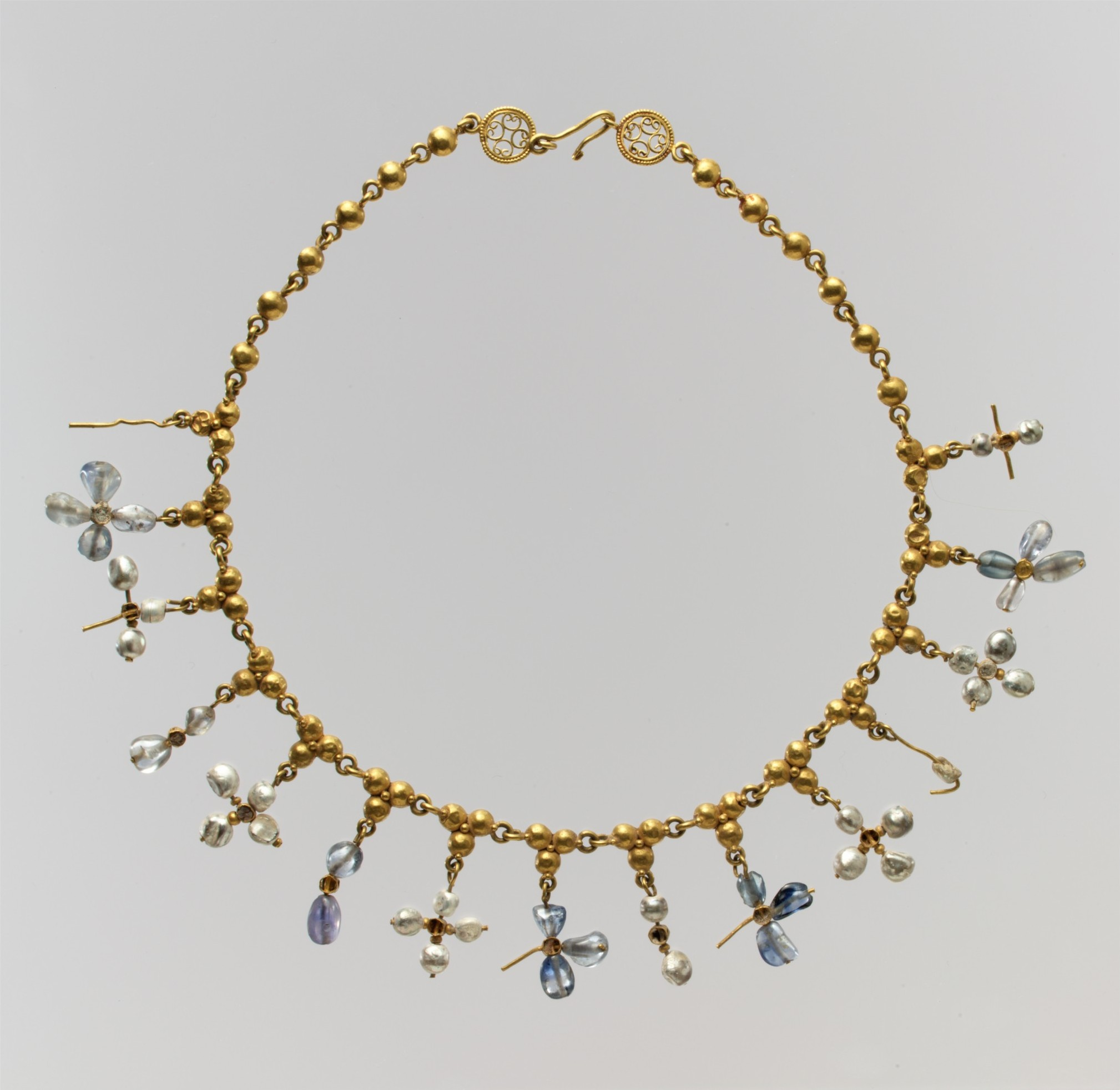
Byzantine Christian cross necklace

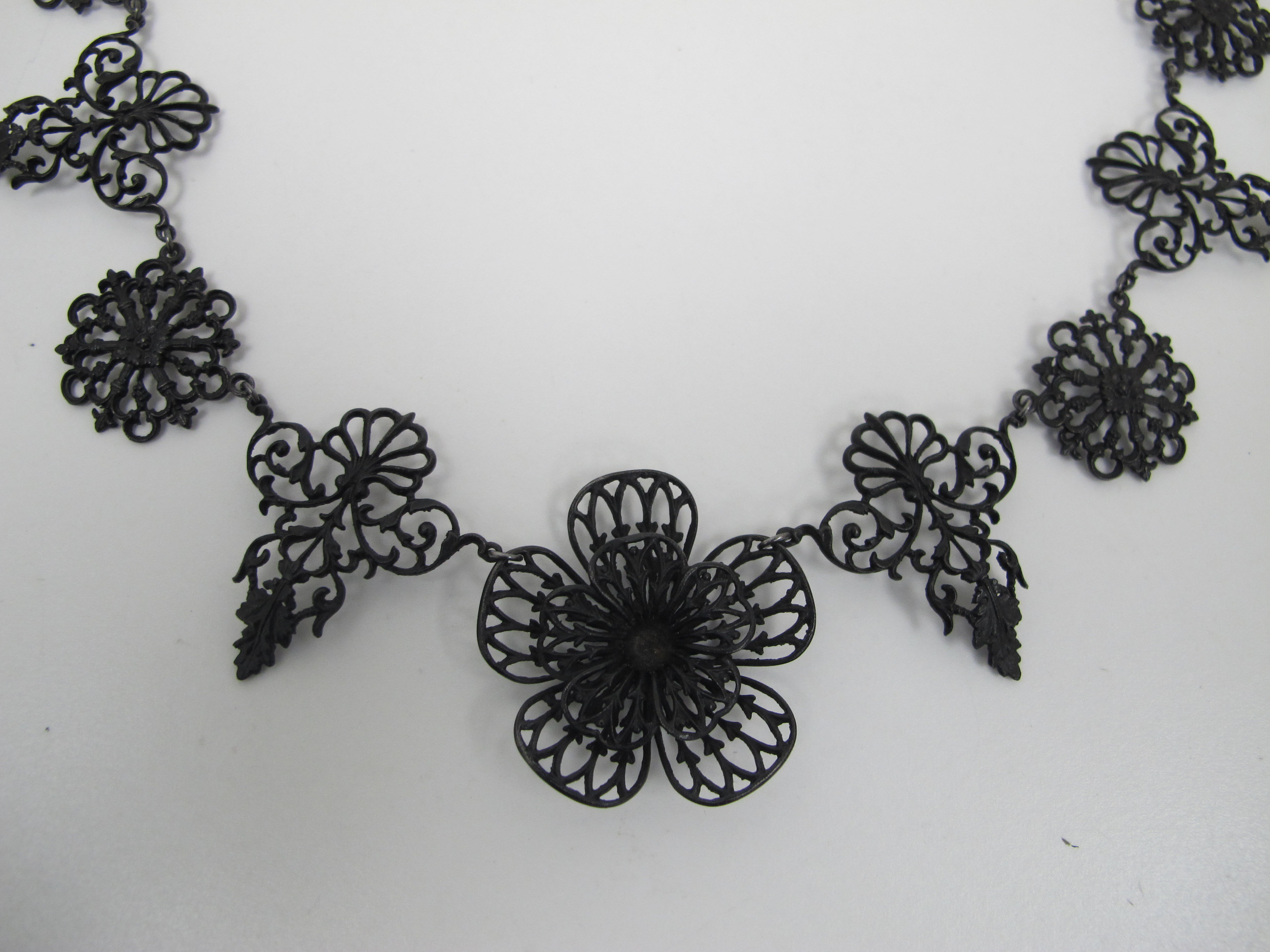
German Metal Necklace

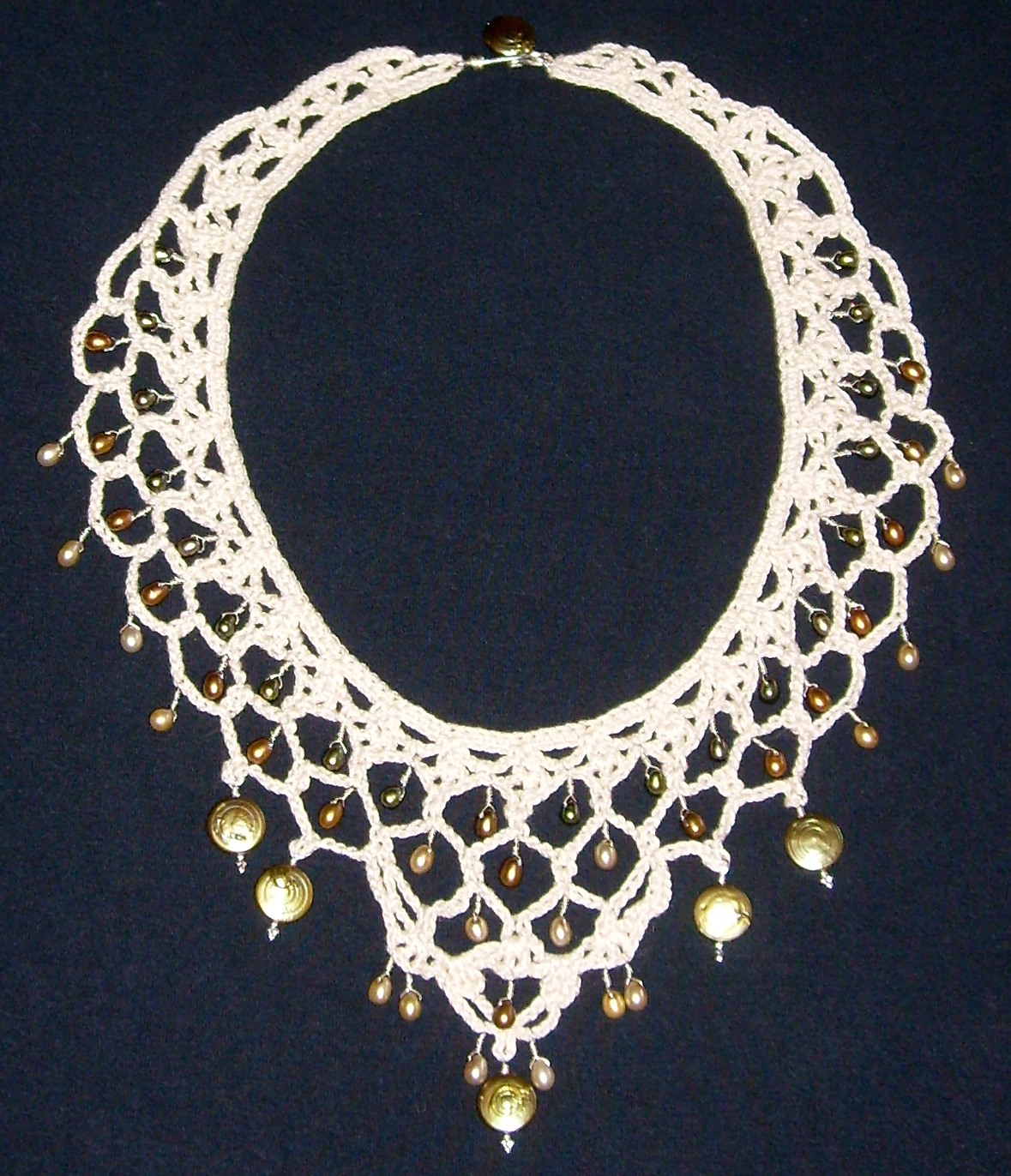
Necklace made from crochet lace, pearls, and sterling silver.

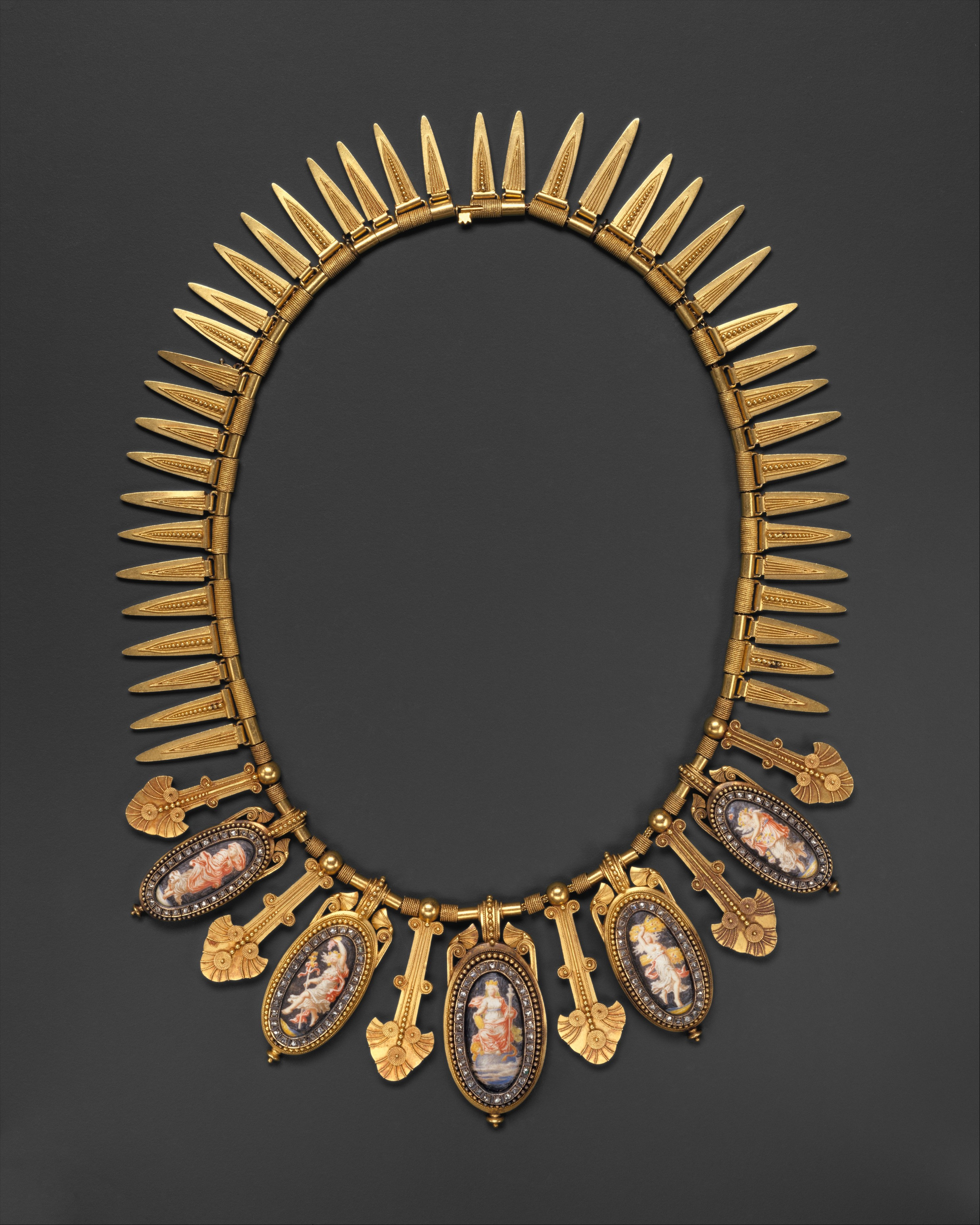
Gold and Platinum French Necklace

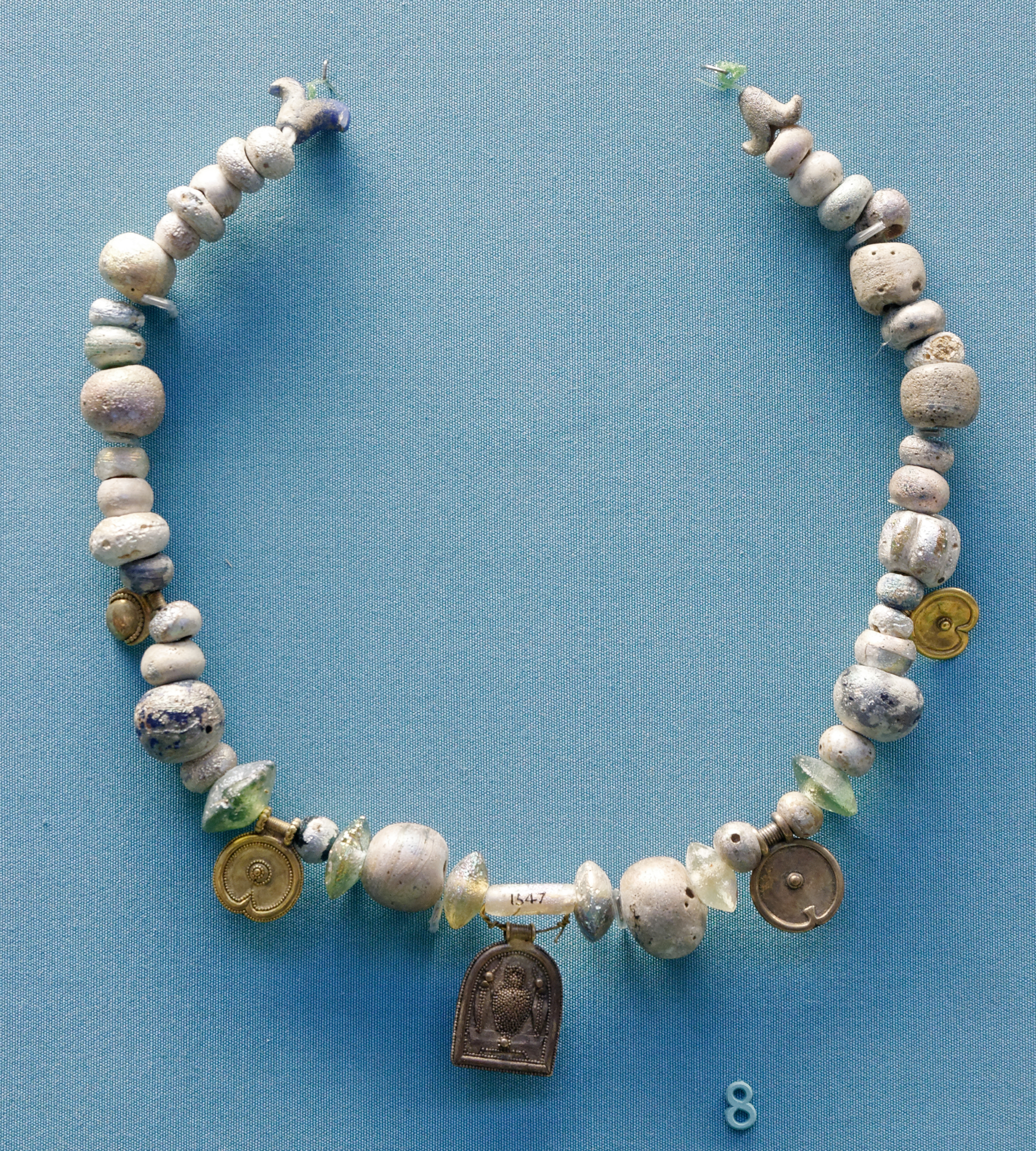
Glass Necklace

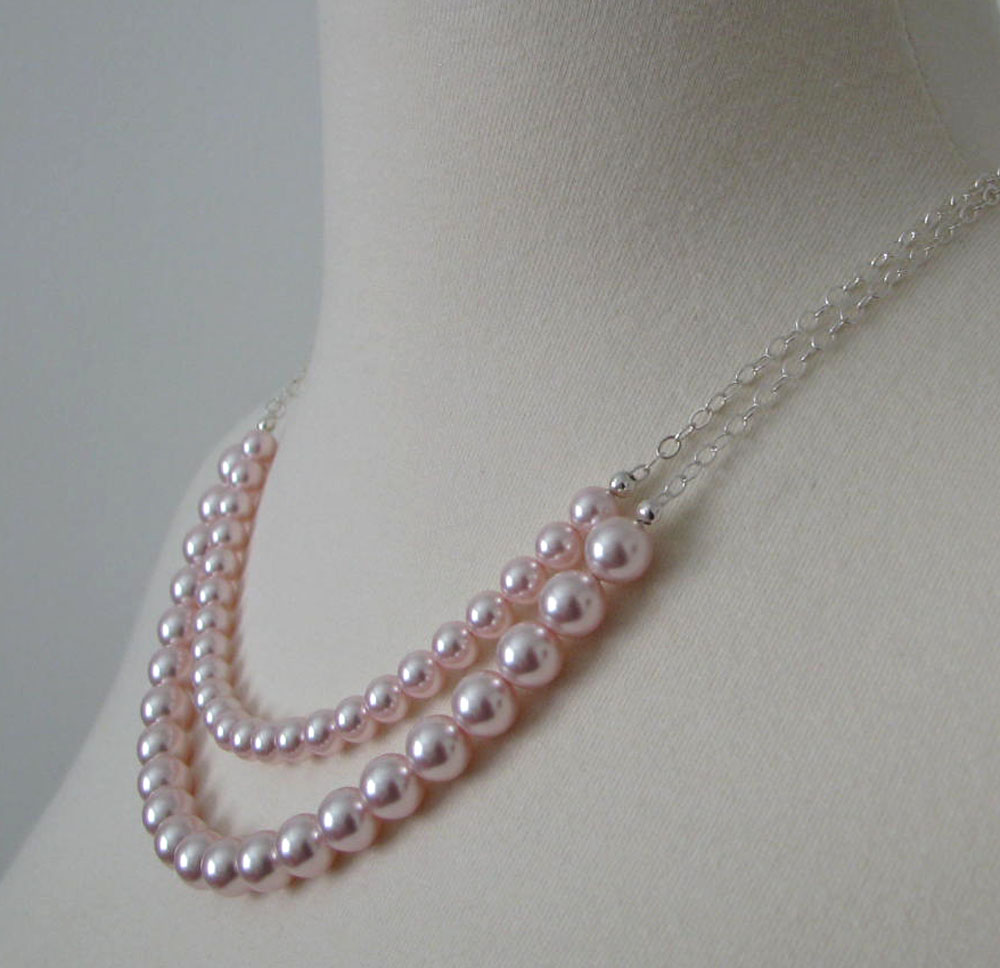
Rosaline Pearl Necklace

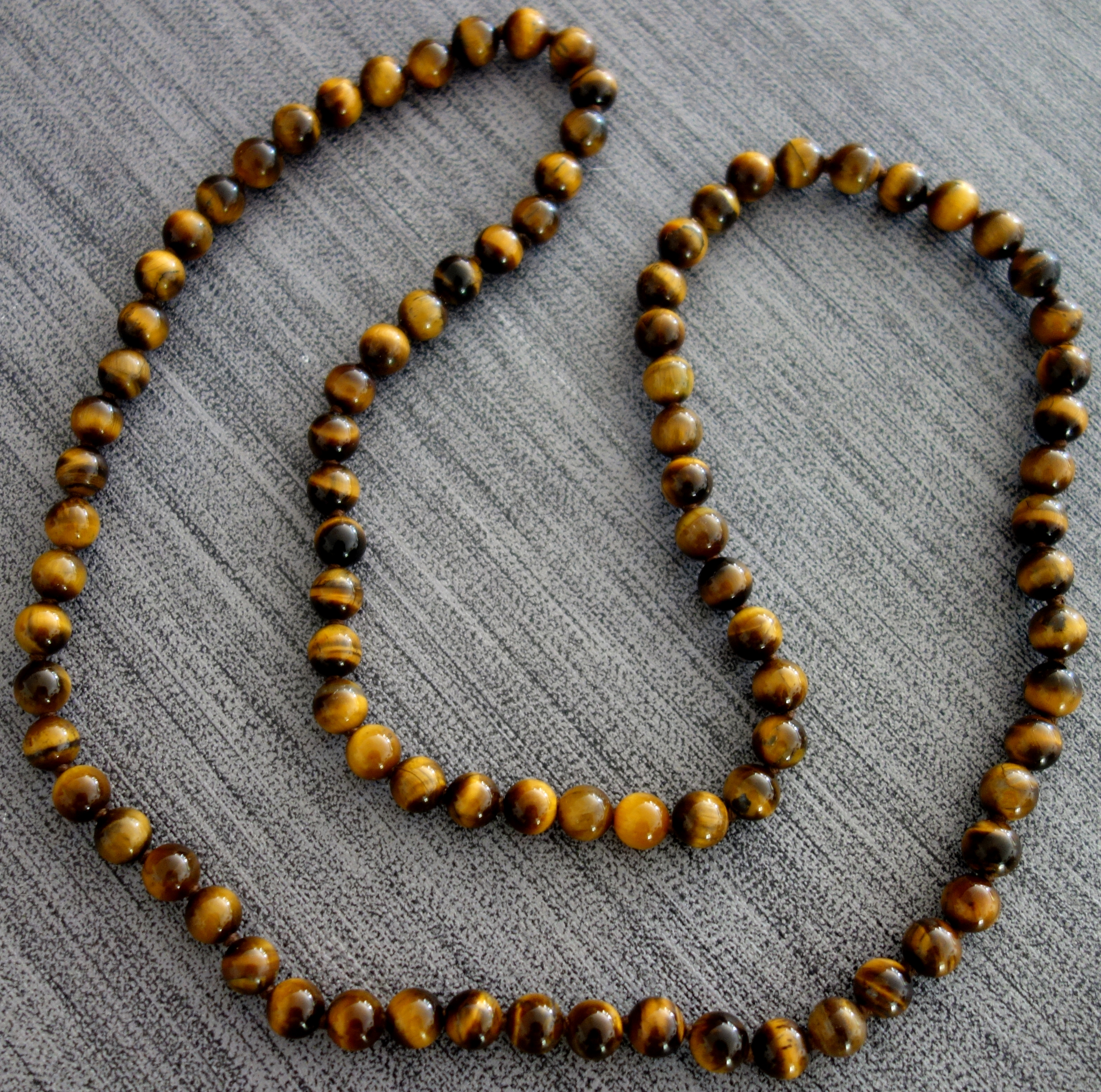
Tiger's eye necklace

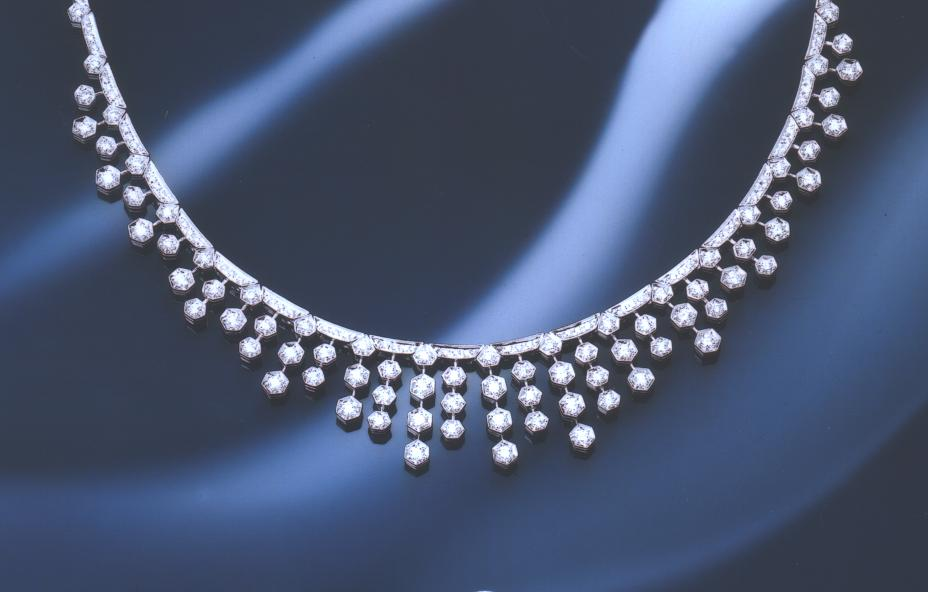
Dirce Repossi White Gold and Diamonds Necklace

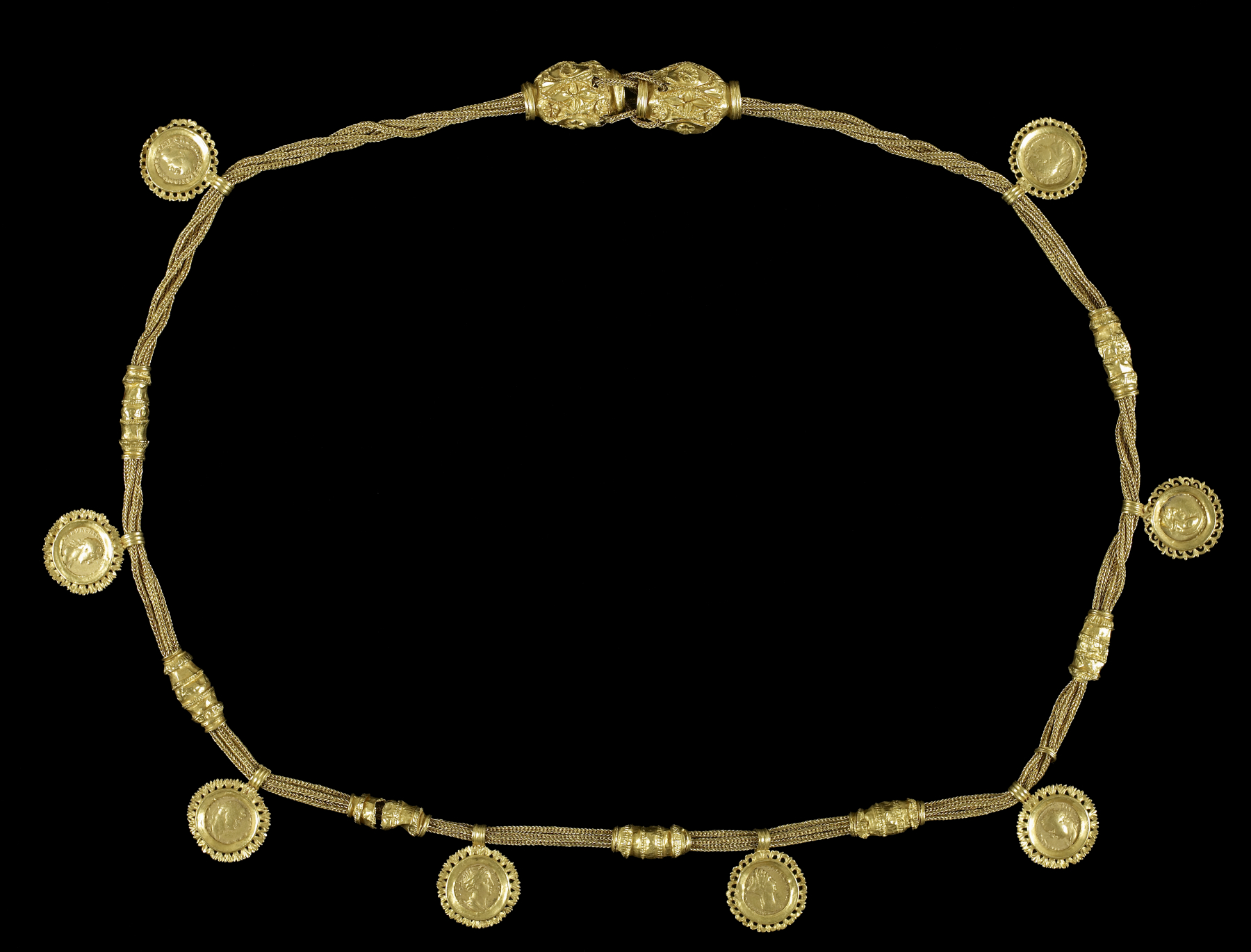
Gold Roman Necklace with Pendant Coins and Braided Chain- Walters 571600

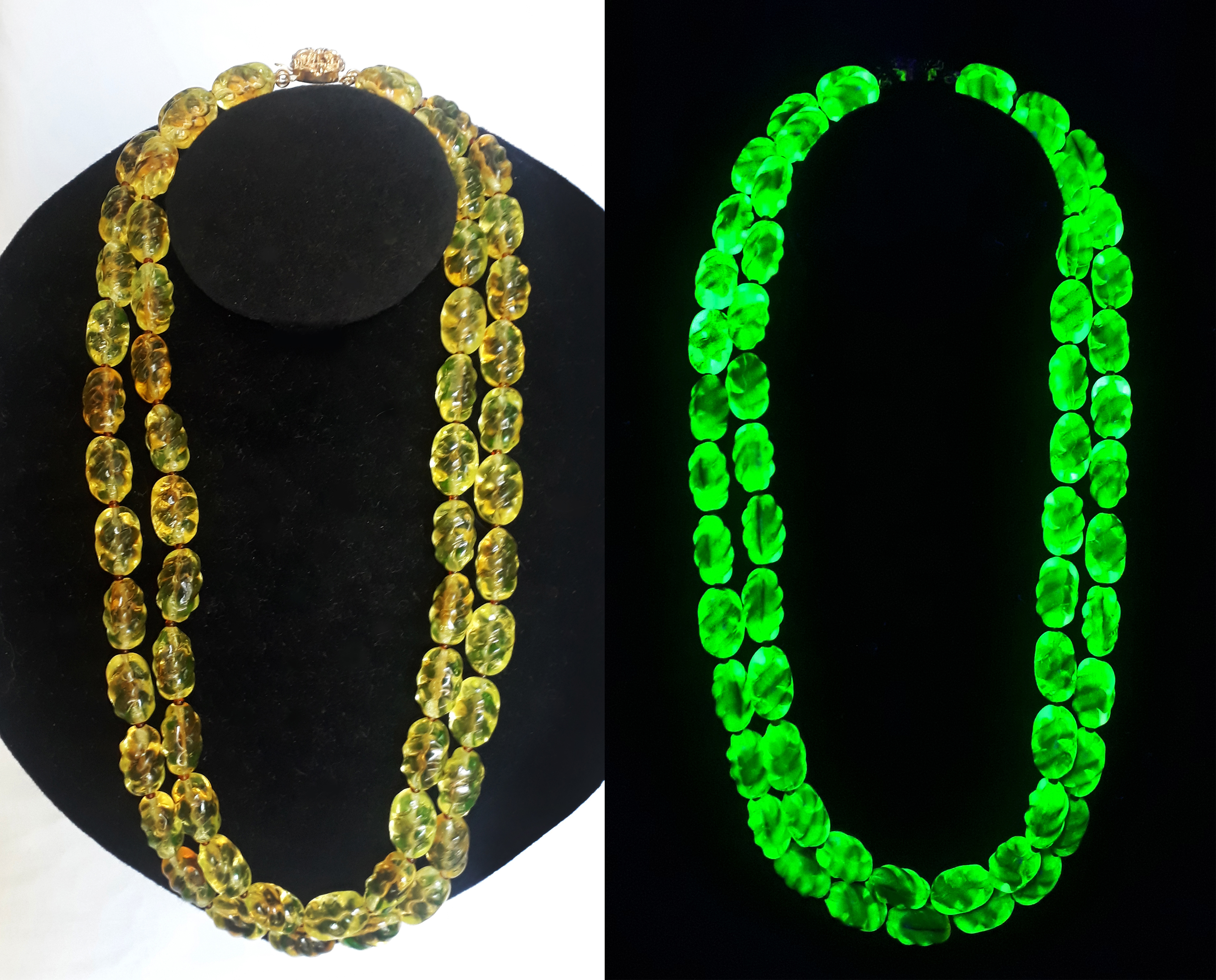
Uranium glass necklace, circa 1940/1950. Uranium glass glows bright green under ultraviolet light.

== Similar items ==
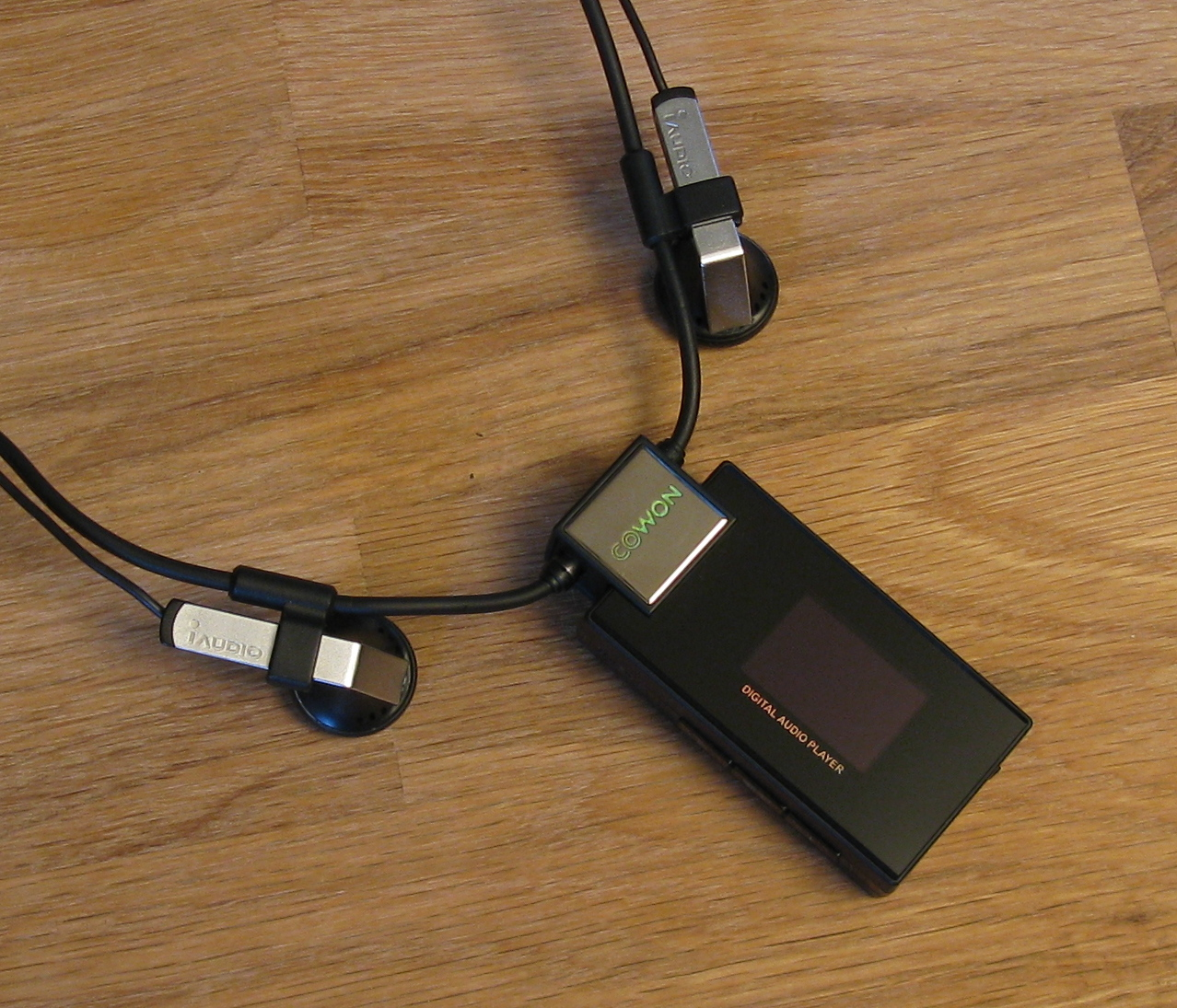
A digital audio player (DAP) designed to be worn around the neck

Pectoral ornaments are jewellery items that are also used similar to a necklace, such as reimiro, and ancient Egyptian pectorals. Non-jewellery items, for example lanyards, for holding badges and cards, are similar to a necklace and are worn on a neck.

== See also ==
- Cross necklace
- Choker
- Figaro chain
- Jewellery chain
- Livery collar
- Locket
- Love beads
- Pendant
- Torc
- Usekh collar
