= Touch of Eva =

- Gossip Girl episode
- Episode no.: Season 4 Episode 4
- Directed by: Andrew McCarthy
- Written by: Leila Gerstein
- Production code: 404
- Original air date: October 4, 2010

Guest appearances
- Katie Cassidy as Juliet Sharp; Clémence Poésy as Eva Coupeau

Episode chronology
← Previous "The Undergraduates"	Next → "Goodbye, Columbia"
- Gossip Girl season 4

"Touch of Eva" is the 69th episode of the CW television series, Gossip Girl, as well as the fourth episode of the show's fourth season. The episode was written by Leila Gerstein and directed by Andrew McCarthy. It aired on Monday, October 4, 2010 on the CW.

Touch of Eva deals with the transformation of Chuck Bass (Ed Westwick) since the arrival of his new love, Eva Coupeau (Clémence Poésy), to New York. The episode also delves into the resurging feelings that Blair Waldorf (Leighton Meester) may or may not have for Chuck, Dan Humphrey (Penn Badgley) facing the aftermath of losing his son that slowly drives him into the arms of Serena van der Woodsen (Blake Lively), and the growing relationship between Nate Archibald (Chace Crawford) and the mysterious Juliet Sharp (Katie Cassidy). The episode is currently the second highest-rated episode of the fourth season.

== Plot ==
The episode opens with Blair receiving news of Chuck Bass donating to charities with Eva at his side. Gossip Girl further irks Blair when she shows an image of Chuck giving Eva an expensive jeweled Cartier Baignoire watch after a charity event. With Serena still wondering whom to choose between Nate and Dan and Blair's growing jealousy against Eva, both girls agree not to meddle in their respective affairs. Dan wakes up to find Vanessa staging an intervention to persuade to express his hurt over losing his son, Milo. Choosing to avoid expressing his hurt feelings, Dan proceeds to Blair's apartment to find Serena and hangout. At the Empire Hotel, Chuck and Eva announce a donation of $5,000,000 to a charity but has not made up his mind as to which charity it will go. Nate and Chuck converse over his transformation and Nate's concerns over Juliet's hectic schedule.

Unable to withstand not meddling, Blair follows Eva selling the watch that Chuck gave her and hatches a scheme to expose her as a gold digger. Blair tries to expose her but fails when Eva explains that she was selling the watch to pay the mortgage of Chuck's valet, displaying her altruistic personality and making Chuck have Eva decide to which charity he will donate to. Dan and Serena's conversation moves towards having fun instead of facing his loss. Blair calls on Serena's aid to uncover dirt regarding Eva's past and Serena recruits Dan to help her. Eva slowly reveals her past to Blair but finds nothing worthy of ruining her. Nate later sees that Juliet has been lying about her whereabouts and is determined to find the truth. Returning to her apartment, Dan and Serena explain that Eva was a prostitute. Blair kicks out Dan and finds Serena reluctant to see him go, not only finding dirt that she could use to ruin Eva but the revelation that Serena chose Dan when she intended to make a choice after Paris. Blair encourages Serena to attend Chuck's party and look for Dan.

At the party, Blair finds out that Chuck is already aware of Eva's past and shrugs off Blair's attempt, Dan and Serena meet but are disturbed by Vanessa, who confronts Dan over his avoiding his loss over Milo and reveals that Serena was making a choice between him and Nate, and Nate confronts Juliet over her lying about her whereabouts. Chuck makes his announcement, stating that he will be setting up a new charity, one that Eva will be heading. Making a last-ditch effort to ruin Eva, Blair takes Chuck's passport from his vale, and puts it in Eva's luggage to frame her for gold-digging and succeeds. Chuck asks Eva to leave but discovers from Lily that his passport was with her. Realizing his mistake, Chuck pleads with Eva to stay, even mentioning "everyone leaves me." However, Eva, heartbroken, still leaves because, after all the love and kindness she has showed him, he still doubted her sincerity and believed Blair. When Nate turns to Serena, a jealous Dan confronts her stating that he knows about her decision between him and Nate, leaving Serena upset. Juliet then reveals that her brother is in jail and Nate gladly accepts her apology and her invitation into her apartment.

The closing montage shows Dan opening his heart regarding Milo and his love for Vanessa, and Juliet paying a concierge for pretending that she owns her expensive apartment and fooling Nate. Chuck, believing that Blair wanted only to hurt him, goes to Blair's apartment and declares war on her for making Eva, the only good thing to come into his life, leave. He reveals that he's returned to his worst self and fires his valet. Blair and Serena, in the closing seconds, comfort each other.

== Production ==
This episode marks Katie Cassidy's fourth episode in the series and the final appearance of Clémence Poésy as Eva Coupeau. A scene involving Eva and Blair was filmed at an Adopt-a-Pet in Queens. Blake Lively and Penn Badgley filmed a scene at Central Park.

=== Fashion ===
For the scene involving Blair helping Eva choose a charity, Meester was dressed in a bright belted Reem Acra shirtdress and Poésy wore a chic navy and white flowered skirt and a classic tan bag. Blake Lively and Penn Badgley were clothed in denim pieces for their Central Park scene. Lively's Nanette Lepore denim blazer was paired with a mini dress and Chanel bag while Badgely was dressed in a classic chambray button down with dark ink-blue jeans.

Many designer gowns were featured prominently throughout the episode. Katie Cassidy was dressed Bibhu Mohapatra printed gown from the Fall 2009 collection, Brian Atwood shoes, MCL statement necklace and Nancy Gonzalez clutch. Leighton Meester was dressed in a blue Jenny Packham gown coupled with Swarovski earrings. Blake Lively wore a red J. Mendel dress with Brian Atwood heels.

== Reception ==
"Touch of Eva" was watched by 2.00 million viewers and achieved a 1.1 Adults 18-49 demo. It also scored a 1.7 rating in adults 18-34 and a 2.8 rating in the network's main target, women 18-34, becoming the most watched show of the network in the latter demo. It's the highest women rating for the series since last season's The Treasure of Serena Madre.

Chris Rovzar and Jessica Pressler of New York Magazine praised Eva's positive influence on Chuck and Chuck's mature confrontation of Eva's past but found that the episode has accomplished "two important things: the dismissal of Eva, who we knew wasn't going to stick around that long, and the reinstatement of the Blair/Chuck tension". The LA Times' Judy Berman however, had grown weary of Chuck the Philanthropist" and preferred the more sinister and womanizing persona of Chuck Bass. Mark O. Estes of Tv Overmind described the episode as "the latest in a string of solid episodes this season.".
