= Nancy Gonzalez (handbag designer) =

Colombian handbag designer

Nancy González
- Born: 1952 or 1953 (age 72–73); Cali, Colombia
- Occupation: Handbag designer
- Children: 2

Nancy González (born 1952/1953) is a Colombian handbag designer who was prosecuted by the United States and found guilty of smuggling exotic animal skins of species protected by CITES. She received an 18-month prison sentence. The indictment also charged two employees who worked for her Colombian manufacturing firm.

González's handbags were sold in stores in the United States, including Neiman Marcus, Saks Fifth Avenue, and Harrods. Celebrities such as Victoria Beckham, Salma Hayek, Britney Spears, the cast of Sex and the City, and others have been photographed with her bags.

== Personal life ==
González was born in Cali, Colombia. She is the mother of two children, Santiago and Cristina. Her son, Santiago Barberi "Santi" Gonzalez, who was president and creative director for her eponymous fashion label, died on 24 March 2017 aged 40. Barberi Gonzalez co-founded the label with his mother in 1998, while still a student at Savannah College of Art and Design, Georgia.
