= Love beads =

Traditional accessories of hippies

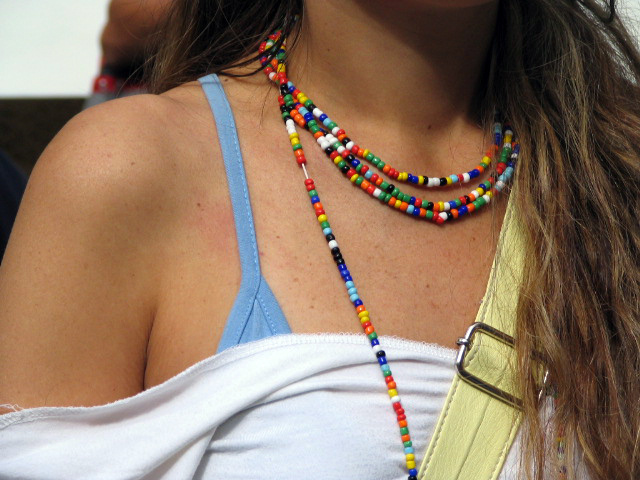
A typical style of love beads.

Love beads are a type of necklace traditionally associated with hippie culture. They consist of one or more long strings of beads, frequently handmade, worn around the neck by both sexes. The love bead trend probably evolved from the hippie fascination with non-Western cultures, such as those of Africa, India, and Native America, which make common use of similar beads.

== In popular culture ==
=== In music ===
- Chet Atkins released a single titled "Love Beads" in 1970.
- The Lemon Pipers released a song called "Love Beads and Meditation" in 1968.
- Ray Stevens mentioned love beads as a key element of hippie attire in the song "Old Hippie Class Reunion" on his album I Never Made a Record I Didn't Like in 1988.

=== In products ===
- According to the official history of the original 1962 Pier 1 Imports store in San Mateo, California, "Our first customers were post-World War II baby boomers looking for beanbag chairs, love beads and incense."

=== In television ===
- In the "Bendin' in the Wind" (2001) episode of the animated series Futurama, Fry, Leela, Amy and Dr. Zoidberg follow Beck's musical tour in a Volkswagen microbus and soon run out of money during their cross country road trip. After inadvertently discovering Dr. Zoidberg naturally produces multicolored pearls as a byproduct of being ill and coughing, the crew fund the rest of their travels by stringing the pearls together and selling them as love beads to highly demanding music festival goers.
- In an episode of The Charlie Brown and Snoopy Show titled "Beads" (1983), Lucy makes love beads for Schroeder.
- In the Mad Men season 6 episode "A Tale of Two Cities", Danny Siegel and other characters whom Don, Roger, and Harry encounter at the Los Angeles parties they attend are wearing love beads.
- In Bewitched, season 5, episode 6, "Mirror, Mirror on the Wall" (Nov. 7, 1968), Endora puts a vanity spell on Darrin. He buys a beaded necklace on his way to work, where a conservative advertising client asks what he's wearing. Darrin replies, “Love beads. They go all the way back to ancient Egypt. The high priest used to wear them.” Later, on his way to a luncheon meeting with the client, Samantha zaps the beads off Darrin, with the words "Come flower power, rip off his beads!"

=== In print ===
In Peanuts newspaper comic, Lucy makes love beads for Schroeder who states he does not like Lucy, causing her to react violently, snatching the beads back and giving them ultimately to Snoopy who appears in the last panel wearing them. Originally appearing in 1968, it was seen in syndicated reprint on September 13, 2015.
