= Statement necklace =

Style of necklace

A statement necklace is a necklace intended to add visual interest to an outfit.

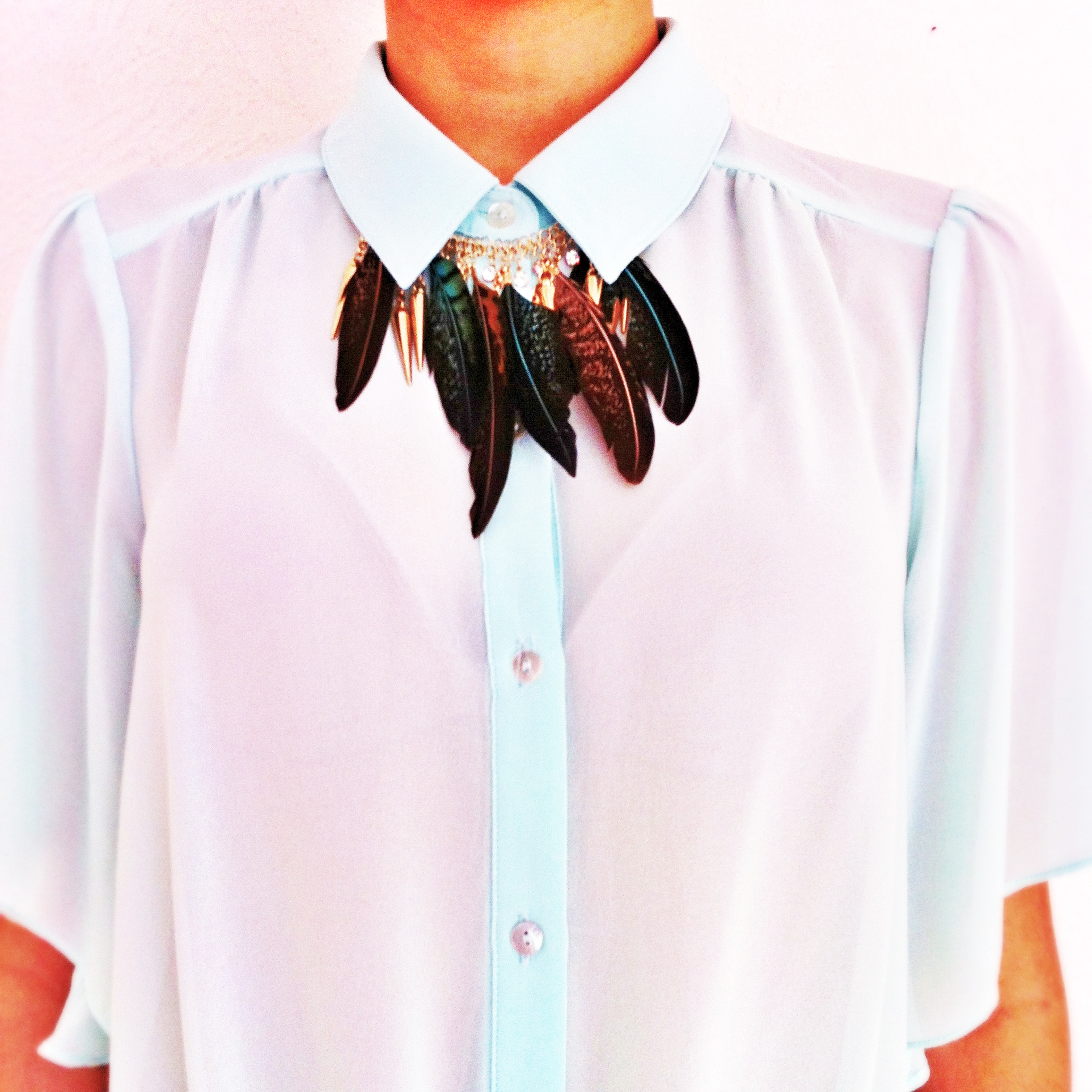
A feathered statement necklace from Forever 21

== Characteristics ==
According to the industry trade group Accessories Council, a statement necklace can be made of any material and is characterized by its function as the “focal point” of an ensemble.

== History ==
While bold jewelry has existed throughout history, the concept of a “statement necklace” is associated with the fashion of the early 2010s. During that period, the accessory was popularized by figures such as Jenna Lyons, then of J. Crew.

== Gallery ==
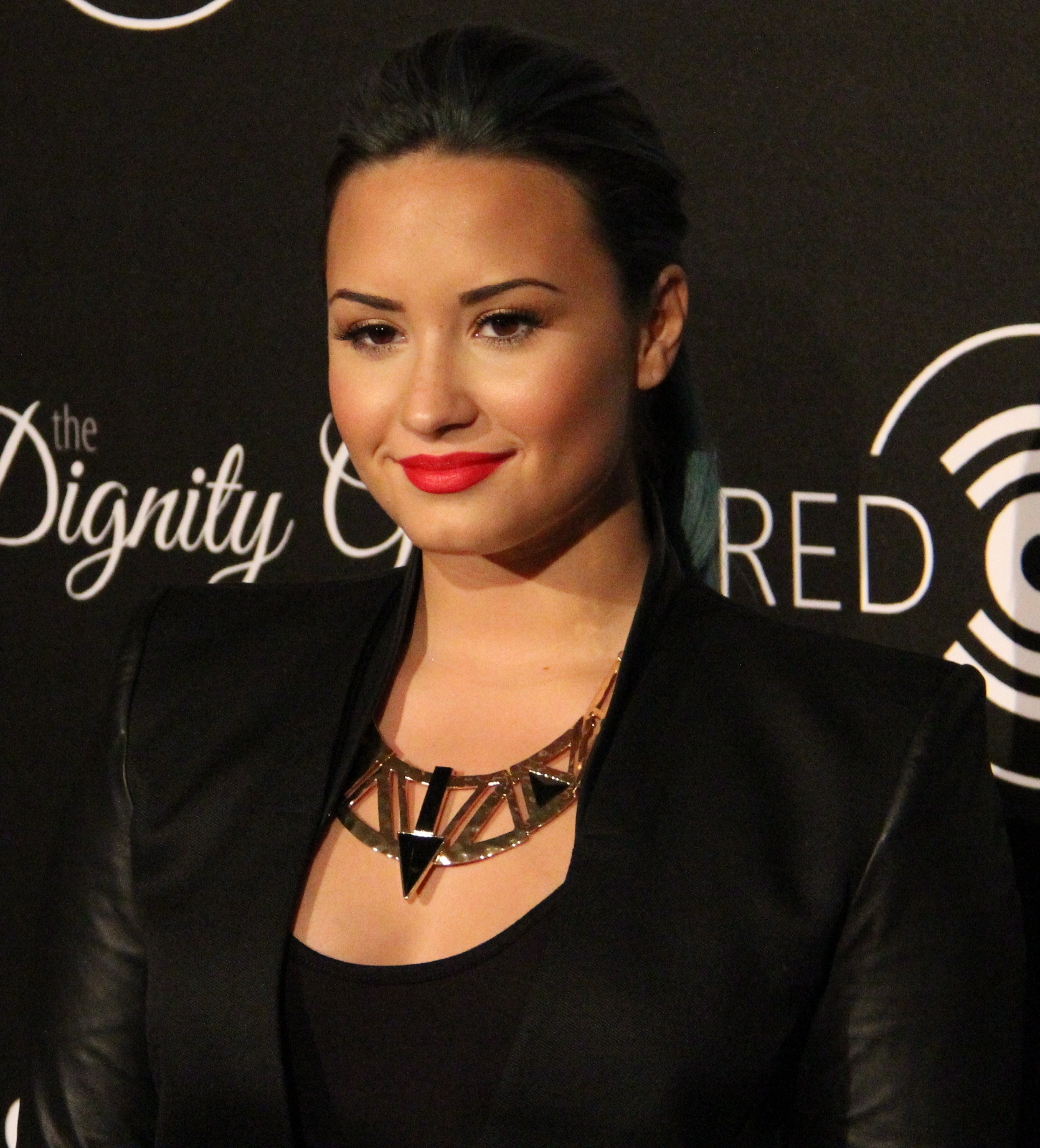
Demi Lovato in 2013

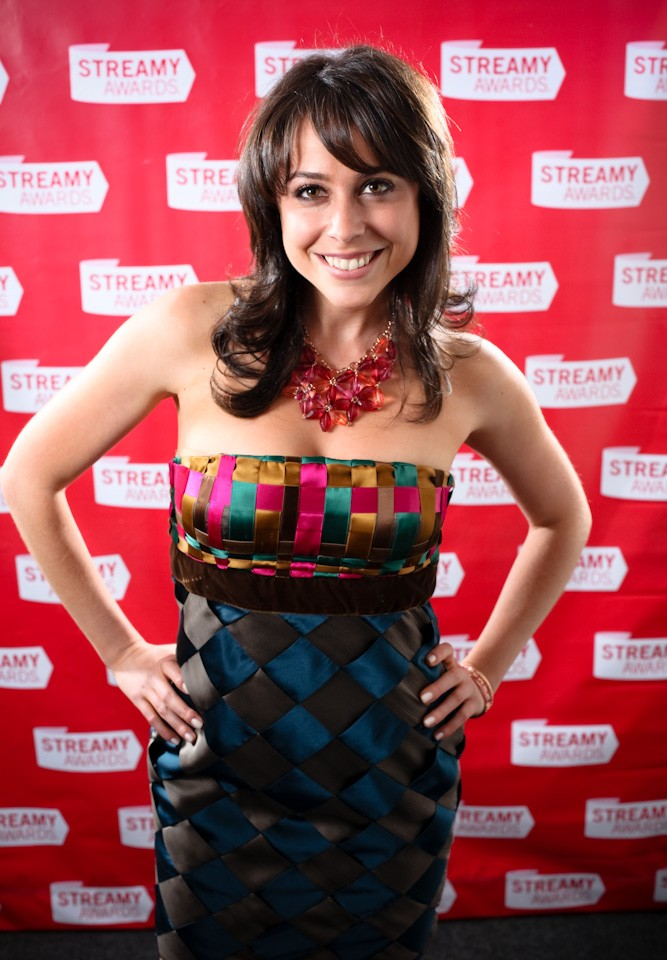
Shira Lazar at the 2009 Streamy Awards

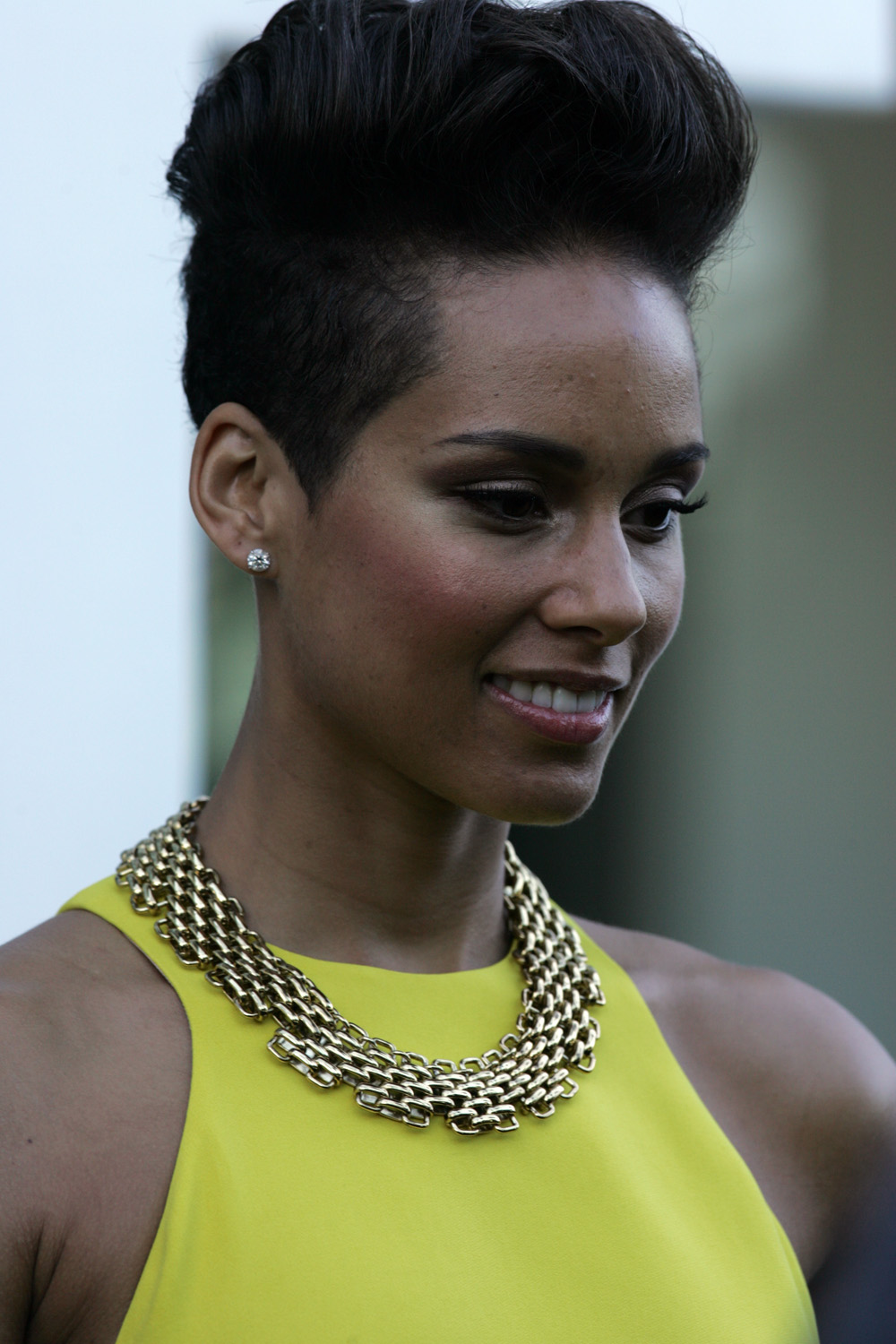
Alicia Keys at the 2013 ARIA Awards
