= Lock charm =

Chinese numismatic charm

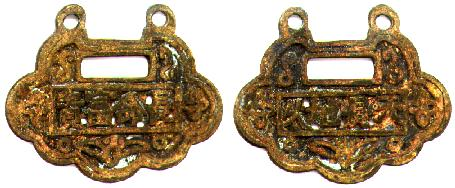
A Chinese lock charm with the inscription cháng mìng fù guì (長命富貴, "longevity, wealth, and honour"). This inscription is commonly found on Chinese numismatic charms.

Lock charms (Traditional Chinese: 家鎖 / 鎖片; Simplified Chinese: 家锁 / 锁片; Pinyin: jiā suǒ / suǒ piàn; Literally translated: "Family lock" or "lock piece") are Chinese numismatic charms shaped like ancient Chinese security locks. Their shape resembles a basket or in most cases the Chinese character for "concave" (凹). The pendants tend to be flat, without any moving parts, or the functionality of the locks they symbolize. They are decorated with both Chinese characters and symbols. Like other types of Chinese numismatic charms, lock charms are meant to protect the wearers from harm, misfortune, and evil spirits, and to bless them with good luck, longevity, and a high rank (through the imperial examination system). In particular, this talisman is meant for young boys, to help "lock" them to the earth, to guard them from death.

Chinese lock charms originated in the Ming dynasty but did not become popular until the 19th century. Their popularity in China was directly related to the supply of silver: historically, silver was a rare metal in China. However, imports from Japan and Spanish America (through the Manilla galleons) during the Ming dynasty allowed the charm's popularity to grow.

Traditionally, lock charms could be bought from silversmiths in various shapes and sizes. Parents would often let a Buddhist or a Taoist priest use their own hands to tie these lock charms to their young sons. Wealthy families often gave their sons lock charms made from jade, nephrite, silver, or gold. While poorer families often bought silver locks for their sons, it was also not uncommon for poorer families' sons to wear brass lock charms.

In use, Chinese lock charms were very similar to Chinese fish charms which were also gifted by parents to their children for protection.

== Symbolism ==
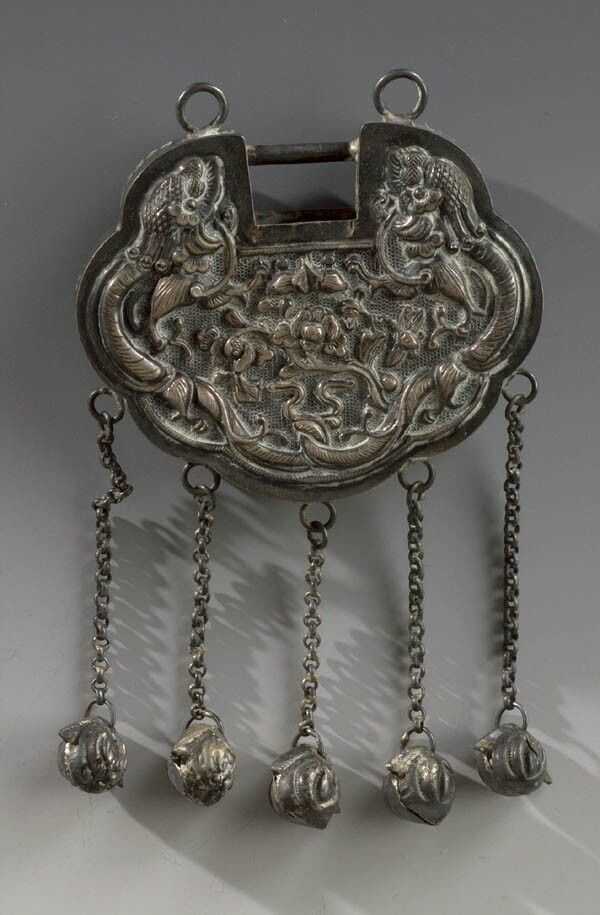
A silver Chinese lock amulet decorated with dragons and peonies. Its ends have small coin-shaped openings to deposit money in. (Museon, the Hague.)

The lock shape itself symbolises an actual security lock, embodying the parents' wish for its wearer to be "locked" to the earth or "locked to life", to ward away death.

Lock charms may feature Taoist symbolism such as the Taijitu and the Bagua and often have other symbols including Taoist deities such as the Sanxing and Kitchen god. The God of Prosperity, Lu, is usually depicted holding a Ruyi scepter and Shou, the God of Longevity, may hold a walking cane and a peach, which in Chinese folk religion refers to the peaches of immortality that can extend one's life by 3000 years. Taoist symbols such as swords wrapped in fillets and ribbons may be displayed to scare away evil ghosts and demons.

Other plants depicted on Chinese lock charms include plum blossoms, which are associated with the five blessings, the peony, which is associated with wealth and honour, or lotus flowers which have two different names in Mandarin Chinese, namely "蓮花" (lián huā) and "荷花" (hé huā), the first character of the former can be used as a homophonic pun with the word "continuous" (連, lián) while the latter could be used to represent the word "harmony" (和, hé) creating a visual pun for "continuous harmony" (連和, lián hé).

Another commonly found theme on Chinese lock charms are the Sanguang (三光) which are a symbol of good luck and could be translated as the "three lights", these include the sun (日), the moon (月), and the stars (星); the sun and moon may be represented with either Chinese characters while stars are often displayed with symbols such as dots. The inclusion of both the sun and the moon symbolises that the lock charm "works" day and night.

Inscriptions on lock charms are usually written from right to left. The most commonly found inscription on Chinese lock charms (and one of the most commonly found inscriptions on Chinese numismatic charms in general) is cháng mìng fù guì (長命富貴, "longevity, wealth, and honour"). Other inscriptions could be used to express a desire for achieving a high rank through the imperial examination system such as zhuàng yuán jí dì (狀元及第, "the first rank at the examination for the Hanlin Academy"), longevity with the inscription cháng mìng bǎi suì (長命百歲, "long life of 100 years"), or a wish for stability with tiān cháng dì jiǔ (天长地久, "as eternal and unchanging as the universe"). Some lock charms feature inscriptions that refer to famous mountains in China such as jiǔ huá míng shān (九華名山, "the famous Mount Jiuhua") and dà máo shān (大茅山, "the great Maoshan") while the names of the geographical regions where these mountains are located may also be displayed on the charm.

== Hundred Family lock charms ==
The Hundred Family lock (Traditional Chinese: 百家鎖; Simplified Chinese: 百家锁; Pinyin: bǎi jiā suǒ) is a special type of silver lock charm. They are shaped as pentagonal, prism-shaped silver boxes with two peaked ends with a bar between. One side of the box is often moulded with four Chinese characters and its peaked ends may depict images of single flowers.

After a child was born in a poor or less wealthy family, the family would traditionally ask a hundred families for a few cash coins (in some traditions, only one), sometimes offering the families areca nuts as a gesture of goodwill, to have an inexpensive lock charm made for their newborn. Families that donated cash coins for the lock charm were expressing a vested interest in the child being secure. Hundred Family locks were either hung on the child as a pendant, or in the house of the family.

== See also ==
- Bulla (amulet), a similar tradition in Ancient Rome.
