= Shenyi =

Historical Chinese robes for scholars-officials evolving from an ancient robe

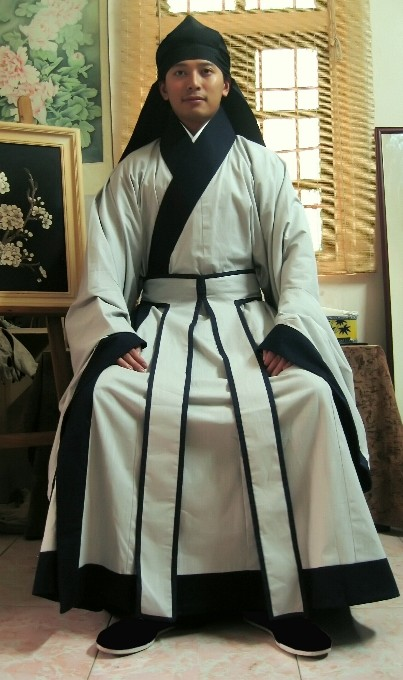
- Modern reproduction of a Confucian shenyi.

Chinese name
- Chinese: 深衣
- Literal meaning: Deep clothing
Transcriptions
Standard Mandarin
- Hanyu Pinyin: Shēnyī
- Wade–Giles: Shên-i

Vietnamese name
- Vietnamese alphabet: thâm y
- Hán-Nôm: 深衣

Korean name
- Hangul: 심의
- Hanja: 深衣
- Literal meaning: Profound gown
Transcriptions
- Revised Romanization: Simui

The shenyi (Chinese: 深衣; pinyin: shēnyī; lit. 'deep clothing'; Korean: 심의; Hanja: 深衣; RR: Simui; Yale: sim.ui) is a type of robe in historical Han Chinese clothing (Hanfu) characterized by obliquely straight plackets with overlapping collars, fastened by a belt and other accessories such as ribbons and buckles. The garment got its name from its complete enveloping of the wearer's body, hence "wrapping the body deep within the clothes". A garment typically worn by Confucian scholars as academic dresses, shenyi was recorded in the Book of Rites (Liji), declined after the Han dynasty, regained popularity in the Song dynasty and remained a formal attire until the fall of the Ming dynasty and the subsequent conquest by the Manchu Qing dynasty.

The shenyi is a long one-piece robe, unlike the Ru–Qun/Ku attire that was more popular among aristocrats and scholar-officials prior to the Qin dynasty, where the upper and lower garments are separate pieces. The shenyi, along with its components, existed prior to the Zhou dynasty and appeared at least since the Shang dynasty, but was developed into a complete system of attire during Zhou dynasty, being shaped by the strict Zhou feudal hierarchical system in terms of social levels, gender, age, and situation and was used as a basic form of clothing. It then became the mainstream clothing choice during the Qin and Han dynasties, by the latter of which it had evolved into two styles: the qujupao (曲裾袍), characterized by helical plackets; and the zhijupao (直裾袍), characterized by straight plackets. The shenyi later gradually declined in popularity around the Wei, Jin, and Northern and Southern dynasties period. However, its influence persisted among the commoners in the following Sui and Tang dynasties, during which the round collar robes such as yuanlingshan and chest-high skirts were more popular within the high society. The shenyi regained popularity as a form of formal wear for educated elites during the Song and Ming dynasties with advocation from famous scholars such as Song dynasty's Zhu Xi in his Zhuzi jiali (朱子家禮), and Ming dynasty's Huang Zongxi, as well as Jiang Yong in the Qing dynasty.

The shenyi was also introduced to other countries of the Sinosphere, where it exerted influences on the formal attire styles in both Korea and Japan. The shenyi is called simui in Korean with the same hanja characters as in Chinese, and was worn by Korean confucianists during the Goryeo and Joseon period. Áo giao lĩnh, a traditional Vietnamese robe worn commonly before the French colonization during the 19th century, was also heavily influenced by the shenyi.

== Terminology ==
The term shenyi (深衣)) is composed of two Chinese characters shēn (深) which can be translated as 'deep' and yī (衣) which literally means 'clothing' in the broad sense. Combined, the term shenyi literally means "deep clothing".

== Construction and designs ==
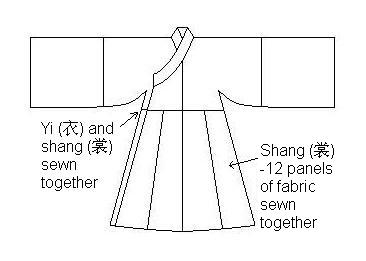
Structure of a shenyi, consisting of a yi and chang sewn together to form a one-piece robe

The structure of the Hanfu system is typically composed of upper and lower parts; it also typically comes into two styles: one-piece garment (where the upper and lower parts are connected together), and two-pieces garments (where the upper and lower parts are not connected).

And as stated by the Liji, the shenyi was one long robe as opposed to the combination of a top and a bottom. However, the structure of the shenyi is made of two pieces: an upper garment called yī (衣)) and lower garment called cháng (裳), which are then connected together to form a one-piece robe. Thus, the shenyi differ structurally from the paofu, which is a one-piece robe where the lower and upper part is cut in a single fabric. Moreover, a standard shenyi was also made up of twelve panels of fabric which were sewn together.

== History of early development ==
The shenyi, along with its components, already existed prior to the Zhou dynasty having first appeared at least since the Shang dynasty. However, in the Shang and Western Zhou dynasties, people prominently wore a set of attire called yichang, which consisted of a jacket called yi and a long skirt called chang. Out of convenience, the yi and chang were sewn together to form a robe; this combination then resulted in the shenyi which was developed in the Zhou dynasty. The shenyi eventually became the dominant form of Hanfu robe from the Zhou dynasty to the Han dynasty remaining popular; From the Spring and Autumn period to the Han dynasty, the loose shenyi with wide sleeves was fashionable amongst the members of the royal families, the aristocrats, and the elites. The loose shenyi which wrapped around the body to the back and lacked a front end slit and was designed for the upper classes of society, especially for women, who wanted to avoid exposing their body parts when walking. The design of this wrap-style of shenyi was an important necessity in a period where the kun had yet to become popular amongst the general population. The preoccupation of the elites with layered, loose-fitting clothing also displayed their desire to distance themselves from the labourers, signalling their high status. By the Han dynasty, the shenyi had evolved in forms; it then further developed in the Han dynasty where small variations in styles and shapes appeared. Following the Han dynasty, the shenyi lost popularity in the succeeding dynasties until it was revived again the Song dynasty.

=== Zhou dynasty period ===
The Western Zhou dynasty had strict rules and regulations which regulated the daily attire of its citizen based on their social status; these regulations also governed the material, shape, sizes, colours, and decorative patterns of their garments. The shenyi was also shaped by the Zhou dynasty's hierarchical system based on social class, gender, age, and the situation. However, despite these complex regulations, the shenyi was still a basic form of garment which served the needs for all classes, from nobles to commoners, old to young, men to women; and people would therefore expressed their identities through recognizable objects, decorations, colours, and materials on their outer garments. Nobles would wear a decorated coat over the shenyi, while commoners would wear it alone.

==== Spring and Autumn period and Warring States period ====
In the early Eastern Zhou dynasty period, there were still strict rules and regulations which regulated the clothing of all social classes and were used to maintain social distinction between people of different classes.

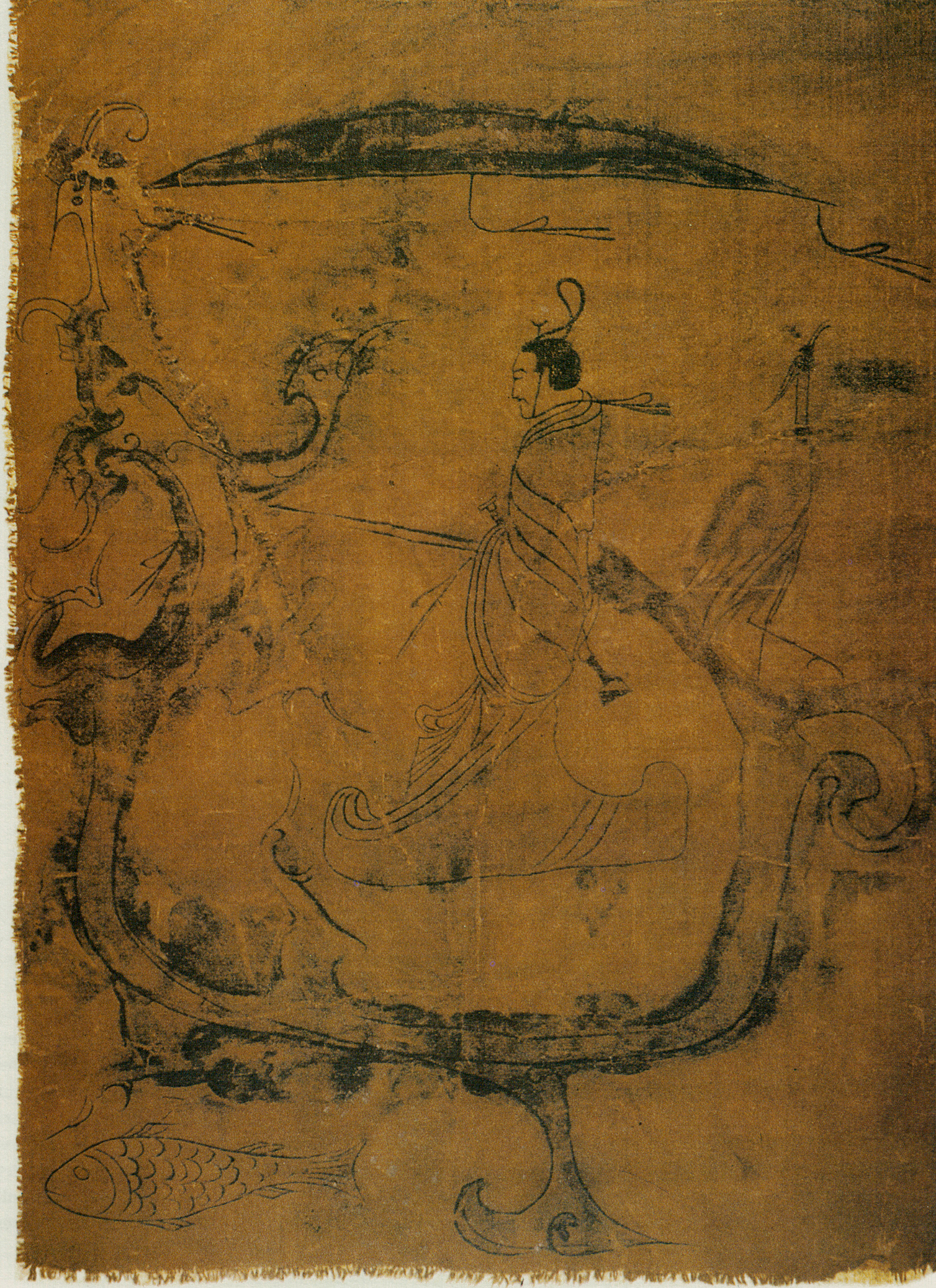
Man wearing a shenyi, from the Silk painting depicting a man riding a dragon.

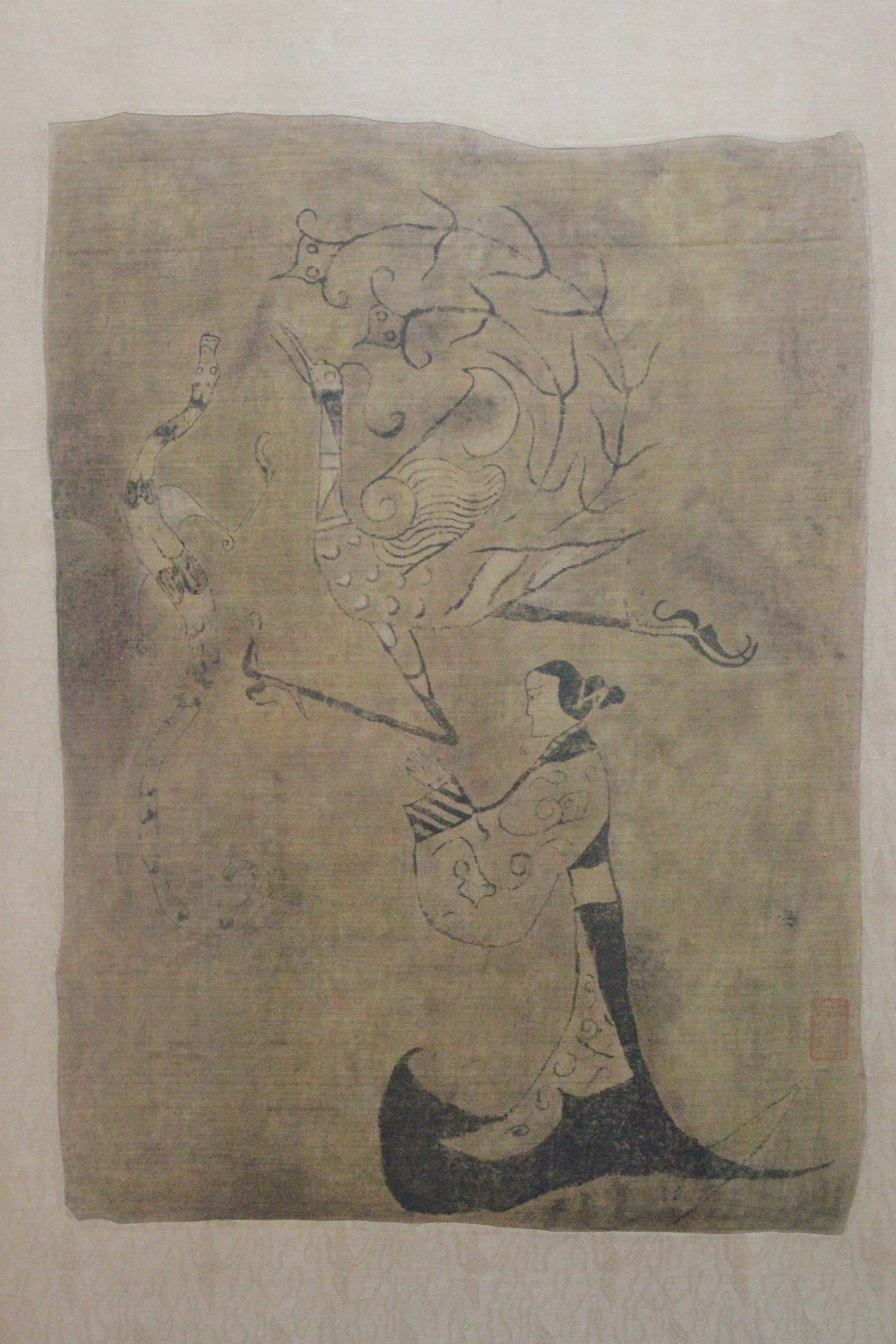
Woman wearing a shenyi (side view), from the Silk painting with female figure, dragon and phoenix patterns

In the Warring States period, the shenyi was a moderately formal style of clothing. The shenyi which was representative of the Warring States period, was designed to have the front stretched and wrapped around the body several times. The wrapping-style shenyi for men and women can be seen in the Silk painting depicting a man riding a dragon and the Silk painting with female figure, dragon and phoenix patterns respectively Both paintings unearthed from a Chu tomb, Warring States period, 5th century BC, Changsha, Hunan Province.

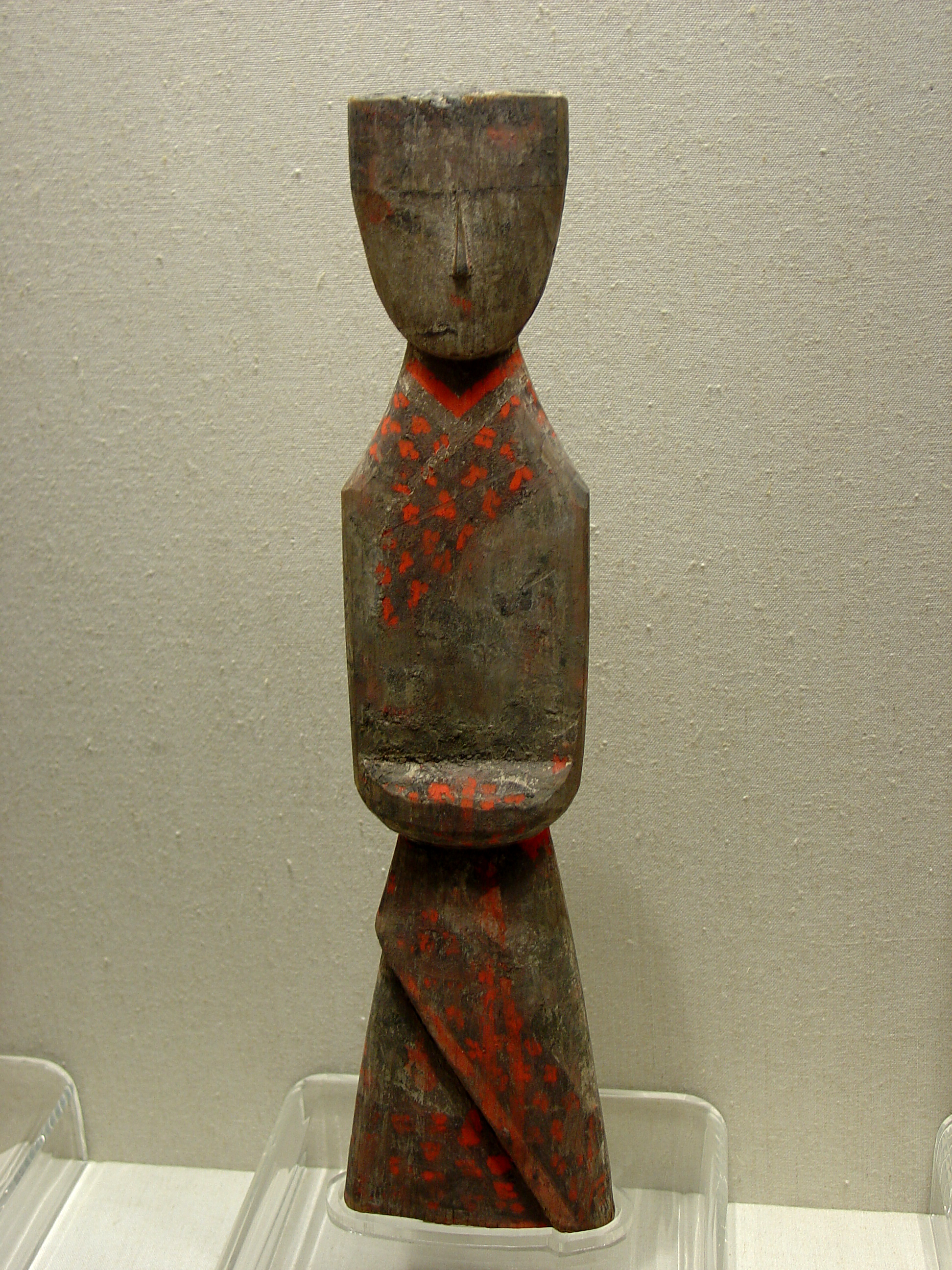
An attendant wearing a representative shenyi (front view) of its period, Warring States period (475–221 BC), Shanghai Museum

Materials which were used in this period tended to be linen; however, when the shenyi was made into ceremonial garments, then black silk would be used instead. It was worn by both the literati and the warriors as it was both functional and simplistic in style. The shenyi was also tied right below the waist level in the front with a silk ribbon, called dadai (大带) or shendai (绅带), on which a decorative piece was attached to.

==== Rules and regulations in the Liji ====
The design features of shenyi also match the ancient Chinese culture. In this period, the shenyi was also deeply rooted in the traditional Chinese ethics and morals which forbid close contacts between males and females. In this period, the shenyi had to conform to the certain rules and regulations which were recorded in the special chapter called Shenyi (深衣) in the Liji. According to the Liji, the ancient shenyi had to fulfill the following:

古者深衣，蓋有制度，以應規、矩、繩、權、衡。短毋見膚，長毋被土。續衽，鉤邊。要縫半下；袼之高下，可以運肘；袂之長短，反詘之及肘。帶下毋厭髀，上毋厭脅，當無骨者。

[Ancient shenyi] had definite measurements, so as to satisfy the requirements of the compass and square, the line, the balance, and the steelyard. It was not made so short as to show any of the skin, nor so long as to touch the ground. The outside pieces of the skirt joined, and were hooked together at the side; (the width of) the seam at the waist was half that at the bottom (of the skirt). The sleeve was joined to the body of the dress at the armpit, so as to allow the freest movement of the elbow-joint; the length of the lower part admitted of the cuffs being turned back to the elbow. The sash was put on where there were no bones, so as not to interfere with the action of the thighs below or of the ribs above.

— Translated by James Legge, Liji: Shenyi

The same chapter described the shenyi as being made of twelve panels of fabric corresponding to the twelve months and all twelve robes are cut into one clothing style. Moreover, the shape of the component of the shenyi is also described:

制：十有二幅以應十有二月；袂圜以應規；曲袷如矩以應方；負繩及踝以應直；下齊如權衡以應平。

In the making (of the garment) twelve strips (of the cloth) were used, to correspond to the twelve months. The sleeve was made round, as if fashioned by a disk. The opening at the neck was square, as if made by means of that instrument so named. The cord-like (seam) at the back descended to the ankles, as if it had been a straight line. The edge at the bottom was like the steelyard of a balance, made perfectly even.

— Translated by James Legge, Liji: Shenyi

These prescribed rules and regulations not only defined the shenyi as the combination of the yi and chang together, but also prescribed the length of the shenyi in this period which had to be long enough to prevent the exposure of the skin but short enough to prevent it from trailing on the floor, and the explanation behind the function of these prescribed measurements, and the location of the belt referred as dai (带; 帶). It also prescribed the rules on the colours and decorations of the trims based on the circumstances of its wearer:

具父母、大父母，衣純以繢；具父母，衣純以青。如孤子，衣純以素。純袂、緣、純邊，廣各寸半。

For ornament, while his parents and grandparents were alive, (a son) wore the dress with its border embroidered. If (only) his parents were alive, the ornamental border was blue. In the case of an orphan son, the border was white. The border round the mouth of the sleeves and all the edges of the dress was an inch and a half wide.

— Translated by James Legge, Liji: Shenyi

Moreover, in addition to the prescribed rules and regulations present in the chapter Shenyi (深衣), more details can be found in the chapter Yuzao (玉藻) of the Liji which described the shenyi as having a youren opening, and being a one-piece long robe with broad sleeve openings; with its circumference at the waist be three times that of the sleeve-opening and that of its hem be even larger:

朝玄端，夕深衣。深衣三袪，縫齊倍要，衽當旁，袂可以回肘。長中繼掩尺。袷二寸，祛尺二寸，緣廣寸半。以帛裹布，非禮也。

In the morning they wore the xuanduan; in the evening, the shenyi. [The shenyi] at the waist was thrice the width of the sleeve; and at the bottom twice as wide as at the waist. It was gathered in at each side (of the body). The sleeve could be turned back to the elbow. The outer or under garment joined on to the sleeve and covered a cubit of it. The collar was 2 inches wide; the cuff, a cubit and 2 inches long; the border, 1.5 inch broad. To wear silk under or inside linen was contrary to rule.

— Translated by James Legge, Liji : Yu Zao

There are two purposes for the loose-cut design: firstly, the body shape is less visible to others; the second reason is to allow the wearer to move the body as freely as possible. The wearer's skin should be appropriately covered to meet the first purpose. The waistband should only accentuate the outline of the waist; the outline of the rest of the body should be well hidden from view. Nonetheless, the second purpose, which engages more freedom of movement for the wearer's body.

===== Cultural significance and symbolism =====
In the chapter Shenyi (深衣) of the Liji, the making of the shenyi is said to match the "compass" (規; gui), the "try square" (矩; ju), the "plumb bob" (繩; sheng), and the "balance scale" (權衡; quanheng). These four tools have normative connotations in Liji: The gui, ju, and sheng generally refer to the rules and standards people should follow; the quanheng defines the ability to balance all the advantages and disadvantages and result in the best solution.

In appearance, rounded cuffs of the shenyi to match the compass; squared neckline to match the squareness, the seams at the back part of the shenyi drop down to the ankle to match the straightness, and steelyard balance the bottom edge to match evenness. The terms "squareness," "straightness," and "evenness" can be used to describe both the physical properties of objects and the moral qualities of people. These wordplays tie the physical properties of tools to virtues. Every part of shenyi has the attributes of an instrument, which gives the text multiple moral meanings.

The Liji also explains how the shenyi helps construct its wearer's character through the symbolic relationship between the tools, virtues, and each part of the shenyi. The circular shape of the cuffs allows the user to raise his arms while walking, allowing him to maintain correct comportment (rong). The straight seams worn in the rear (fusheng) and the square neckline worn in the front (baofang) are intended to straighten one's approach to political issues. The bottom edge is meant to seem like a steelyard balance to calm one's thoughts and focus one's aim.

The back seam of the shenyi is first linked to the physical characteristics of "straightness" in the sheng and then to the moral trait of "straightness." When attention to political matters, the wearer of the shenyi will be straight in the sense of becoming "upright" the design of the square-shaped neckline indicates "making correct" corresponds to the wearer's role performance. The evenness of the bottom edge is supposed to be able to keep the wearer's thoughts "even" in the sense of "balancing," allowing him to focus on a single goal. Liji emphasizes how each part of shenyi represents a moral trait, such as selflessness, straightness, and evenness.

Nevertheless, the chapter Shenyi (深衣) also emphasizes the body effects on wearers. The body concealing and physical movement freedom are two significant reasons why shenyi was made in this design. Body mobility is brought up again in Liji, which says that the cuffs are created round to allow the wearer to cultivate his physical comportments (rong), not because roundness indicates a certain moral quality. In early Confucian ethics, having refined body comportment is regarded ethically significant. The shenyi allows the user to cultivate a person's comportment while also cultivating one's character by allowing a broad range of body mobility.

The Liji also implies that the symbolic meanings of the shenyi which may be sensed by the wearer's body, in addition to being accessed cognitively and mentally. Both the Chinese verbs "to carry" (fu) and "to embrace" (bao) employed regarding the straight seams and square-shaped neckline frequently indicate a close bodily relationship between its subject and object. These two words are widely used to describe how the human body moves. The text implies that the wearer's body carries and embraces the straightness and squareness. Therefore, it can be sensed through the tactile sensations when the shenyi contacts the wearer's skin. Moreover, the evenness of the bottom border of the shenyi may be sensed when the wearer stretches it with his hands or when his thighs naturally meet it while walking. The users of shenyi may need to walk smoothly and firmly to keep its bottom edge even.

The design of the shenyi also encourages its wearer to use their bodies in a certain way. The fact that the text alternates between explaining the moral characteristics that the shenyi represents and discussing how it links to the wearer's body indicates that the design of shenyi has considered both the physiological and psychological-cognitive effects it has on its wearer.

==== Mid-warring states period ====
By the Mid-warring states period, however, the rules and regulations started to disintegrate. This can be observed in the Mashan tombs, where a lady, who was a member of the shi class, (Note: The 'shi' was a social stratum in ancient China which ranked just above the class of commoners, see Sheng, 1995. After the Spring and Autumn period, it became a term for scholars and intellectuals, see Zhang, 2015, pp. 257) was buried some time around the year 340 – 278 BC with twelve long robes which were all cut in the approximate style of shenyi whether they were padded with silk floss (mianpao), single in layer (danyi) or lined (jiayi). The forms of these shenyi, however, were not standardized and show variations in cut and construction. Moreover, some of the textiles and decorations used in making those robes were against the rules and regulations for her ranks and violated the rules which were stipulated in the Liji. The shenyi found in the Mashan tombs had a straight-front which falls straight down.

=== Transition from Warring States period to the Han dynasty ===
The shenyi grew in popularity during the transition period from the Warring States period to the Western Han dynasty; and with its increased in popularity, the shape of the shenyi deviated further from its earlier prescriptions. (Note: The early prescriptions refer to the rules and regulations which were previously established in the Liji) During the Qin and Han dynasties, the shenyi dominated the connection method of the upper and lower parts and became the mainstream choice.

==== Qin dynasty ====
In the Qin dynasty, Qin Shi Huang abolished the mianfu-system of the Zhou dynasty and implemented the shenyi-system specifying that third ranked officials and above were required to wear shenyi made out green silk while commoners had to wear shenyi which were white in colour. This system adopted by Qin Shi Huang laid the foundations of the Hanfu-system in the succeeding dynasties.

==== Han dynasty ====
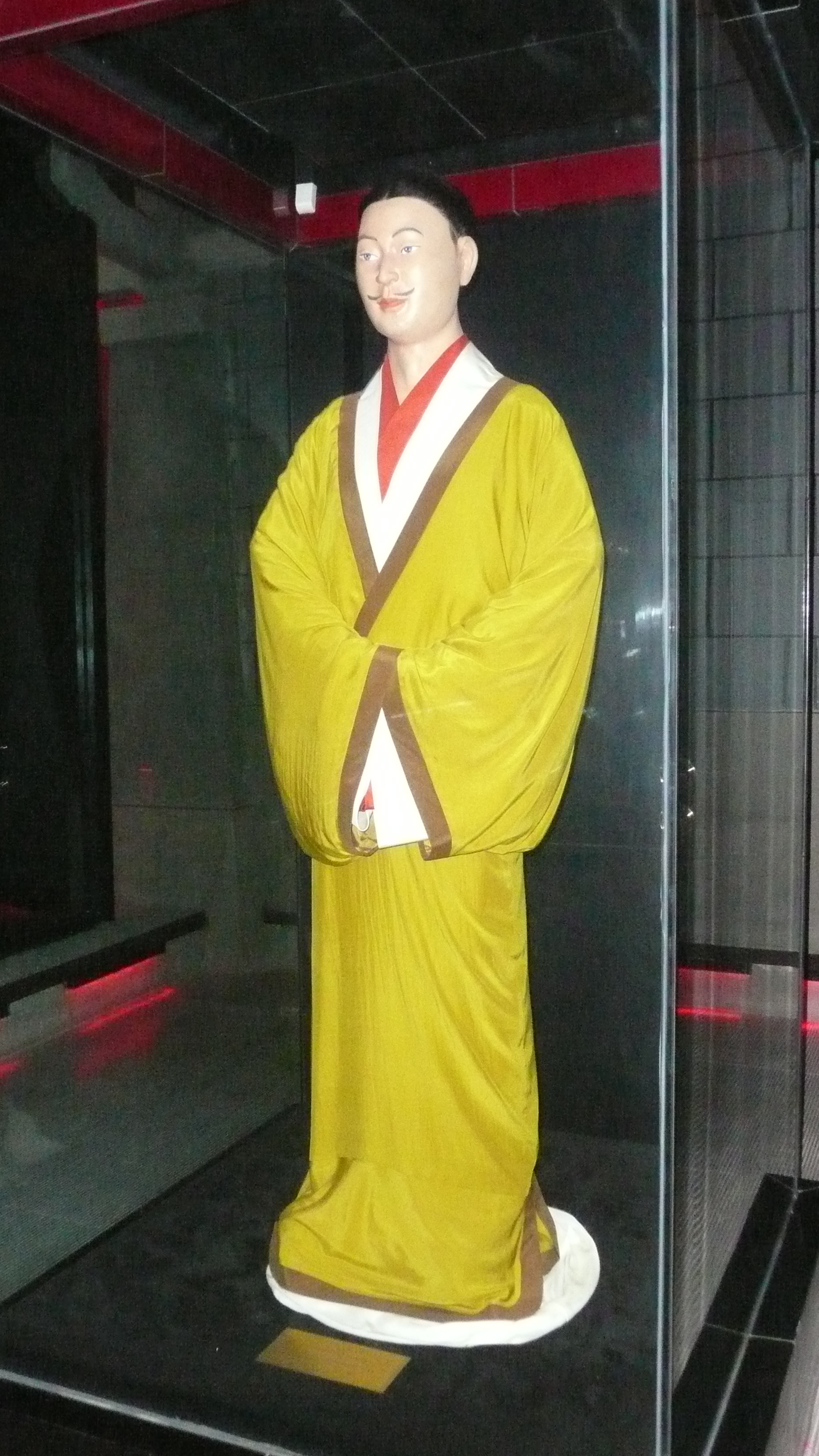
Reconstruction of Han dynasty shenyi.

The Western Han dynasty also implemented the shenyi-system, which featured the use of a cicada-shaped hat, red clothes, and a collar in the shape of tian (田), and garments which were sewn in the shenyi-style with an upper and lower garment sewed together. The shenyi was also worn together with the guan and shoes as a form of formal attire in the Han dynasty while in ordinary times, shanku attire and the ruqun attire were born by men and women respectively.

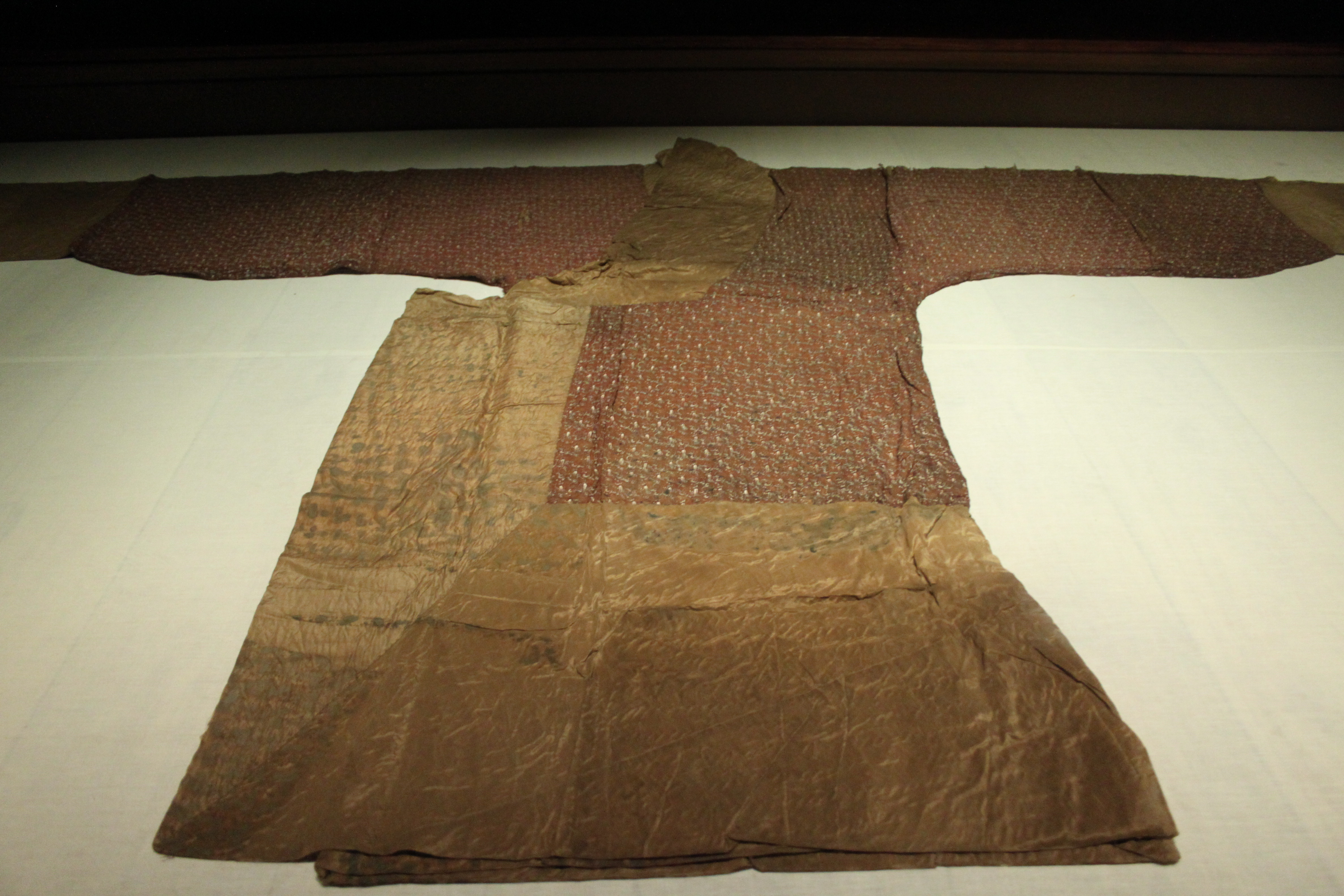
Unearthed zhijupao shenyi from the Mawangdui tomb, Western Han dynasty

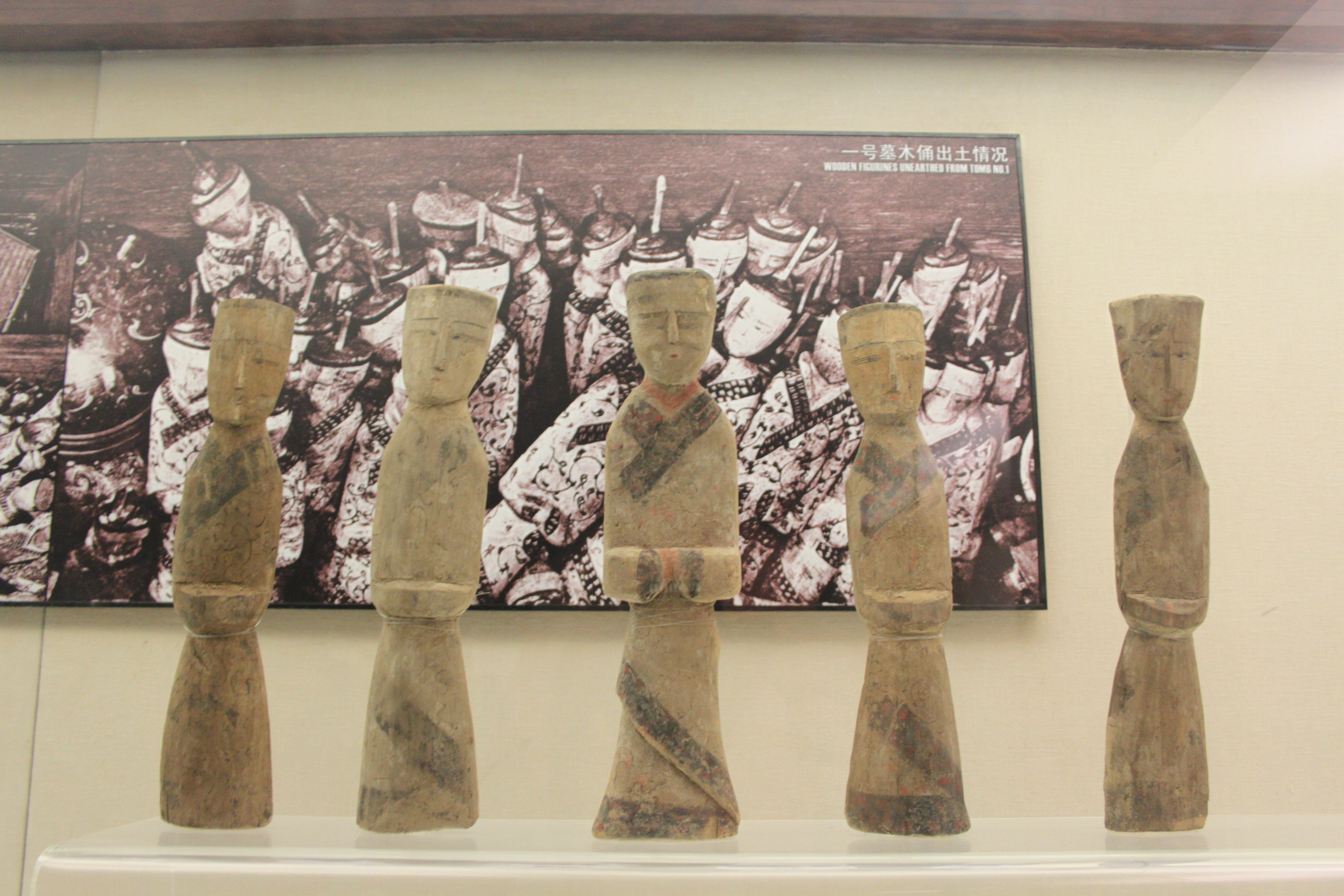
Maid figurines wearing qujupao shenyi with one wrap, Mawangdui tomb, Western Han tomb

By the Western Han dynasty, the shape of the shenyi had deviated from the earlier versions as it can be found in the Mawangdui tomb of the same period belonging to Lady Dai. The shenyi had evolved into two types of robe: the qujupao (曲裾袍; 'curved robe'; "curved gown"), and the zhijupao (直裾袍; 'straight robe'). These two robes differed from each other based on their front opening and the way their lapels overlapped: the qujupao would curve and wraps the dress to the back while the front opening of the zhijupao would fall straight down. The qujupao directly evolved from the wrapping-style shenyi which was worn in the pre-Qin period and became popular in the Han dynasty.

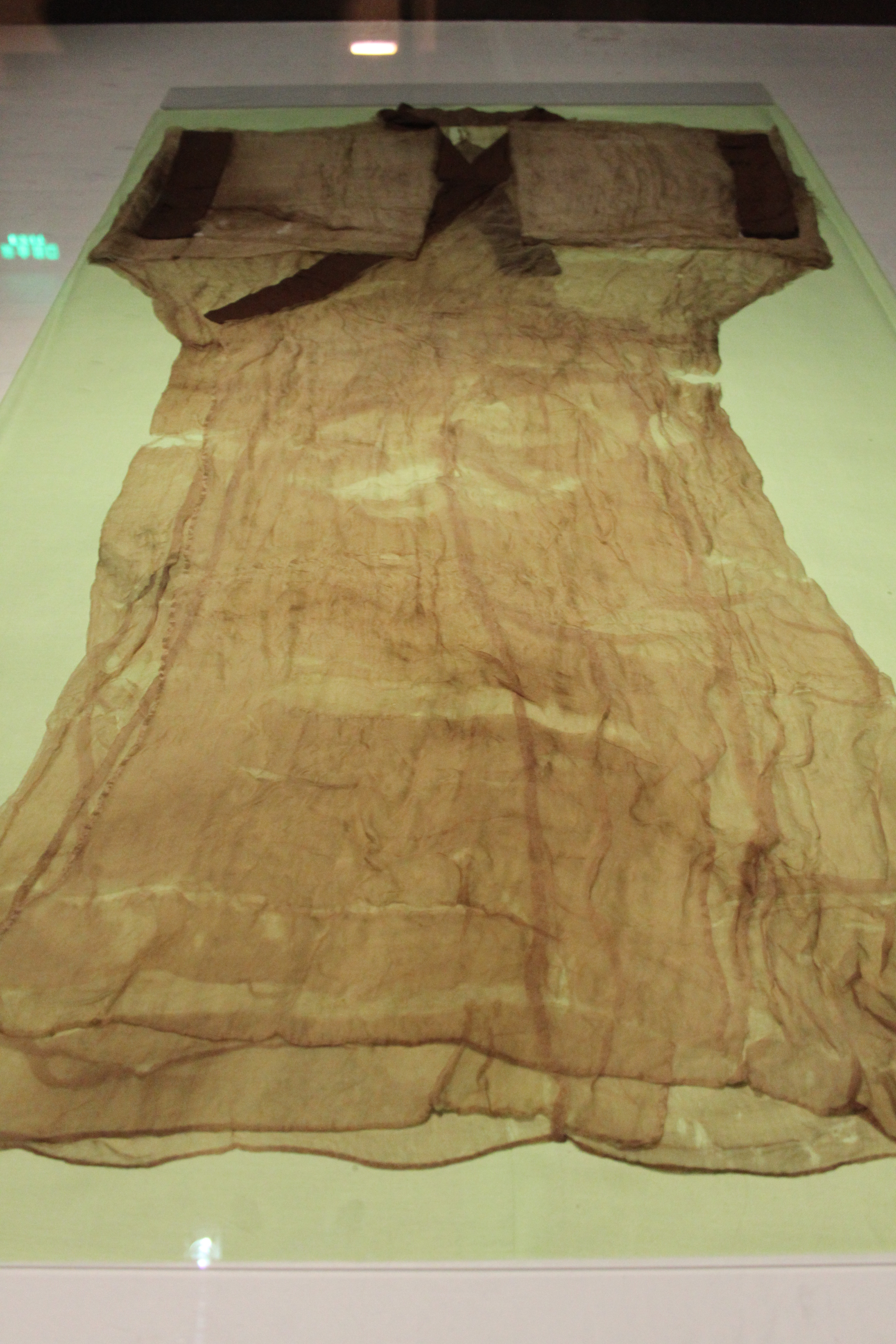
Zhijusushadanyi shenyi, from the Mawangdui tomb, Western Han dynasty

The qujupao was more luxurious than the zhijupao as it required approximately 40% more materials than the zhijupao, therefore the presence of more wraps in qujupao indicates that the robes are more increasingly more luxurious.

Moreover, the shenyi in this period, regardless of its cut, could also be padded, lined, or unlined. More examples of unearthed archeological artefacts of shenyi made of diverse cuts and materials from the Mawangdui tomb can be found in Museums, such as the zhíjūsùshādānyī (直裾素纱襌衣; 'straight plain gauze unlined robe'), the qujusushadanyi (曲裾素纱褝衣; 'curved plain gauze unlined robe'), and simianqujupao (丝绵曲裾袍; 'silk cotton qujupao'), found in the Hunan Museum. According to the Western Han dynasty-era Fangyan by Yang Xiong, the danyi (襌衣; 'unlined clothing')—also called die (褋), zuoyi (袏衣), and chengyi (裎衣) depending on its geographical location—was called shenyi in ancient times.

There were also gradual changes but clear distinctions in the form of the shenyi between the early and late period of the Western Han dynasty. In the early Western Han, some women wore body-hugging shenyi which was floor length with wide and long sleeves, long enough to cover the hand. Others wore qujupao with a flowing extended panels which would create a tiered effects at the back.

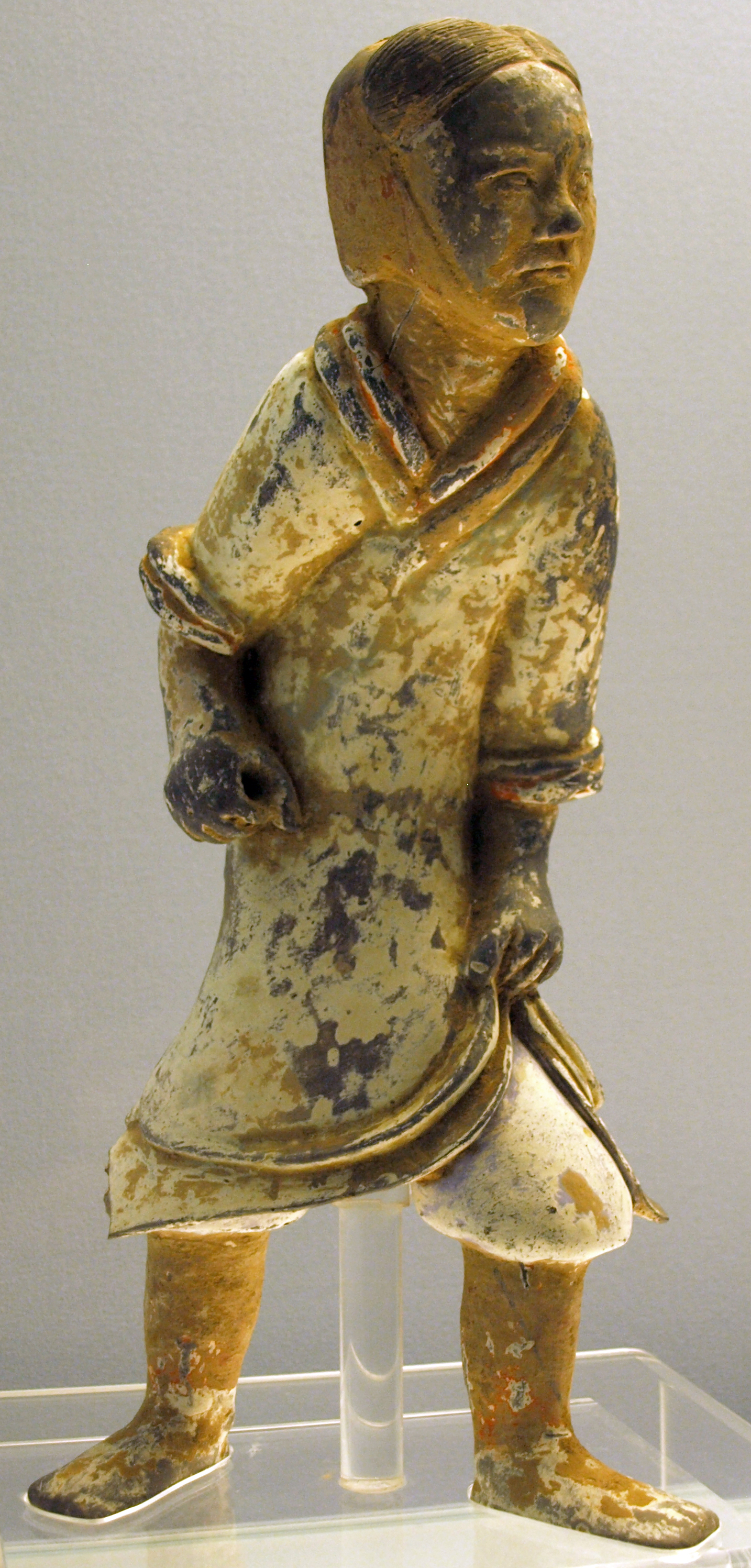
Zhijupao chanyu with kun, Eastern Han dynasty

Moreover, the design of the shenyi was closely related to the evolution of the Chinese trousers, especially the ku. A form of zhijupao, known as chan or yú (褕) or chānyú (襜褕), also became popular in the Han dynasty. However, when the chanyu first appeared, it was considered to be improper to use it as a ceremonial garment; it was also improper to use it outside of the house, and it was also improper to wear it at home when receiving guests. The disrespectful nature of wearing chan yu at the court was even recorded in the Shiji. Reasons why the wearing of chanyu was considered improper in those circumstances might be related to the wearing of the ancient ku, which were trousers without crotches; and thus, this form of zhijupao might not have been sufficiently long to cover the body which was a disgraceful act from its wearer. In the Shuowen Jiezi chapter Jijiupian (急就篇) by Shi You, also dating from the Western Han dynasty, the set of attire called zheku (褶袴) consisted of a trousers called zhekukun (褶袴褌) which was covered by the chanyu (襜褕), a short and tight knee-length robe. The kun (褌) were a form of Chinese trousers with crotches as opposed to the ku.

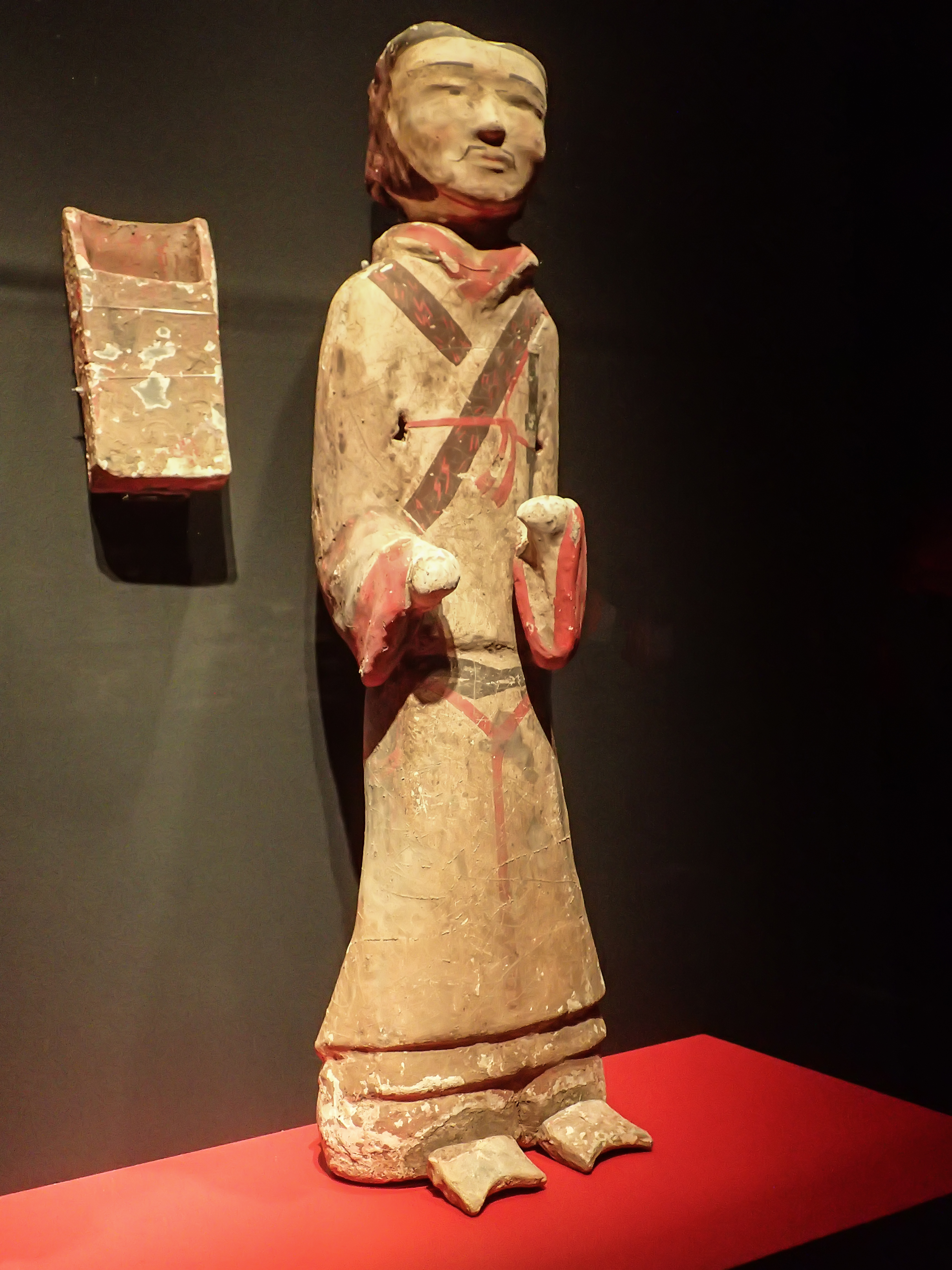
A guard wearing an ankle-length zhijupao with kun, Western Han dynasty

With time, when the kun became more popular, the zhijupao, which was shorter and easier to put on than the qujupao; the zhijupao then started replacing the qujupao which had been long enough to cover the ku. The kun, however, were only popular for some people of certain occupations, such as warriors, servants, and the lower class, in the Han dynasty and was not widely used by the general population as it was not easily accepted by the traditional etiquette of the Han culture. Therefore, the kun was never able to replace the ku; moreover, the design of the ancient ku had also evolved with time becoming long enough to cover the thighs, with some parts even covering the upper parts of the hips, such as the qiongku which was especially designed for women in the Western Han dynasty court. By the middle of the Western Han dynasty, the qujupao became nearly obsolete; and by the late Western Han dynasty, the shenyi were straight rather than spiralled. In the Eastern Han dynasty, very few people wore shenyi.

== History of later development ==
=== Song dynasty ===
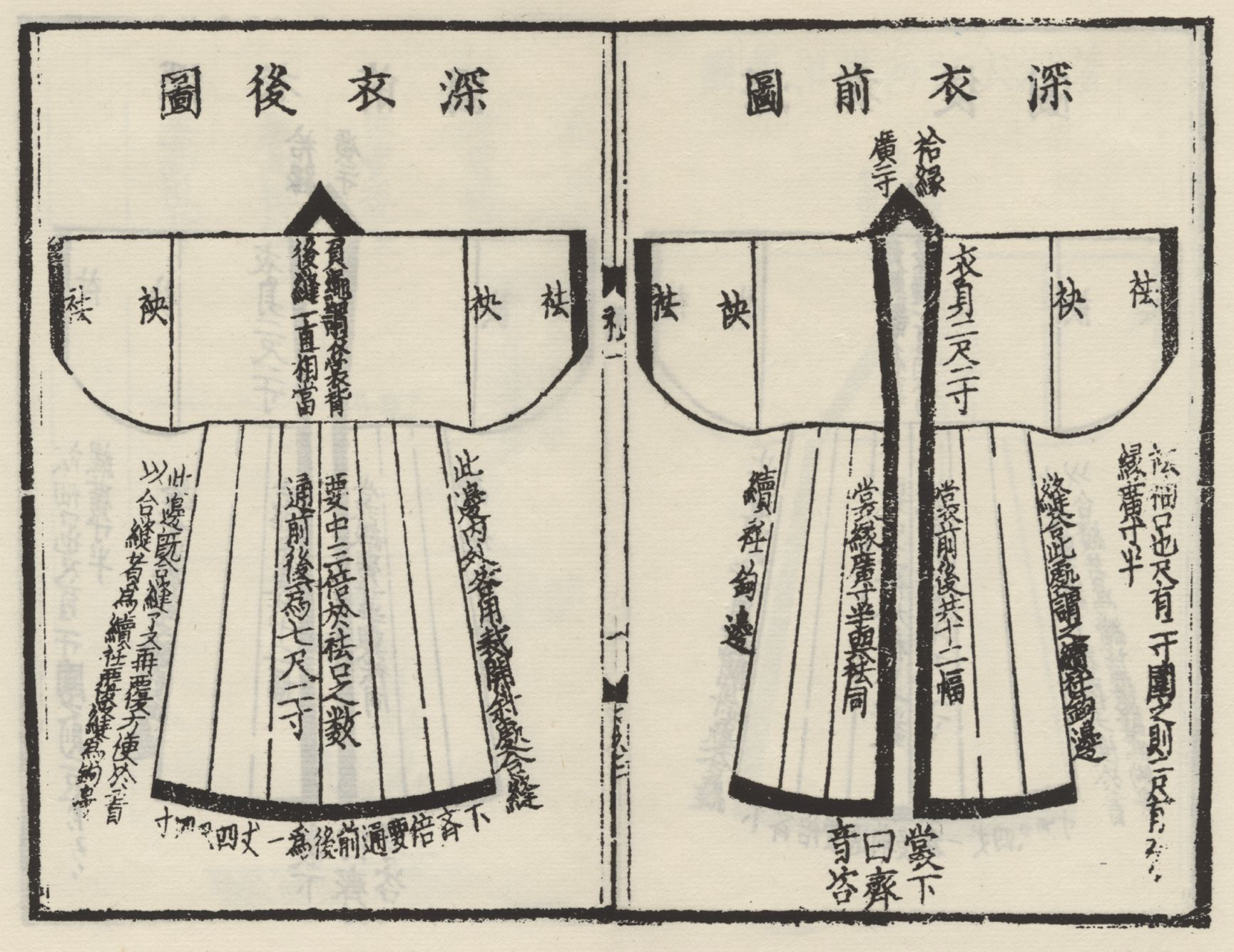
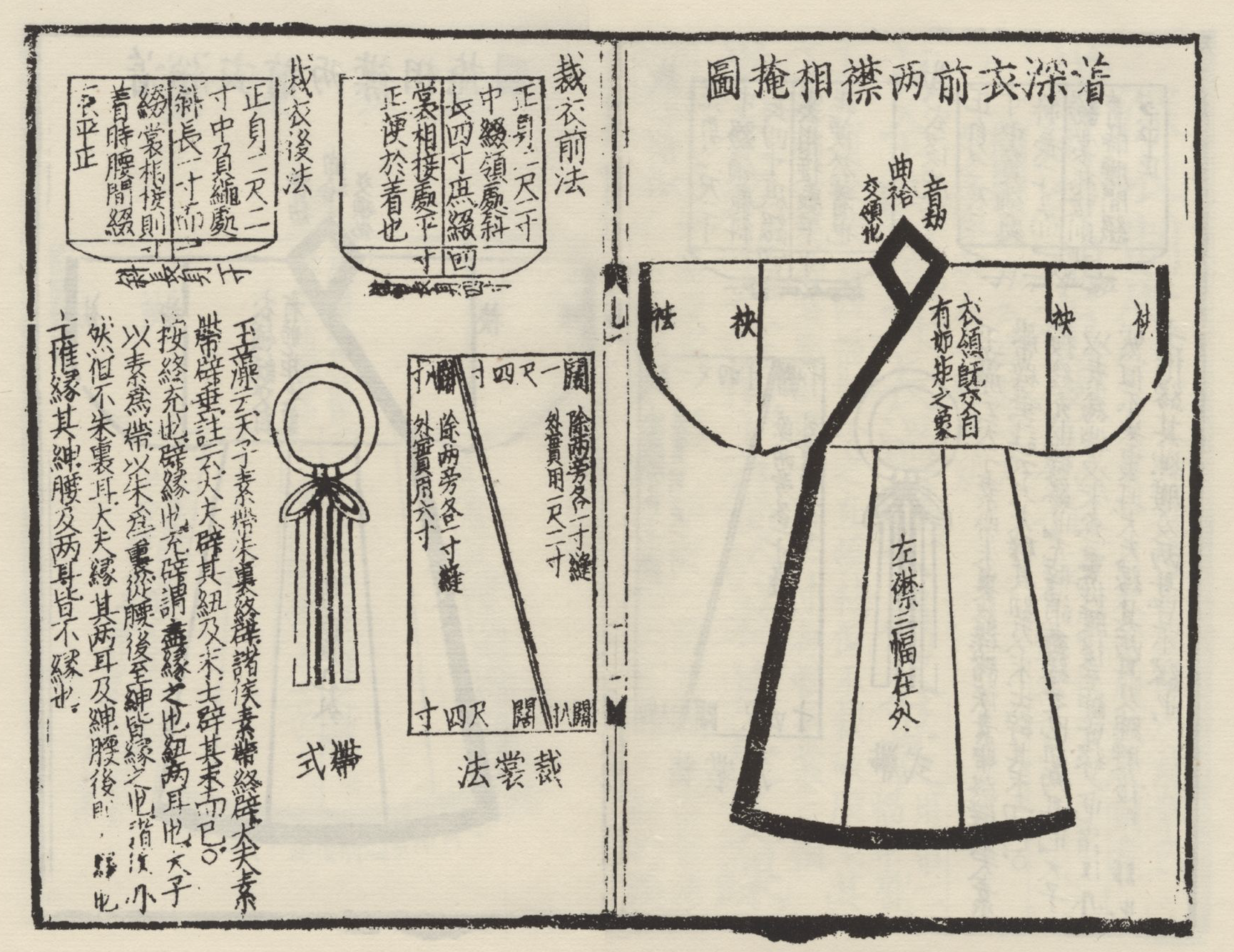
Diagram of Song dynasty shenyi based on Zhuzi jiali.

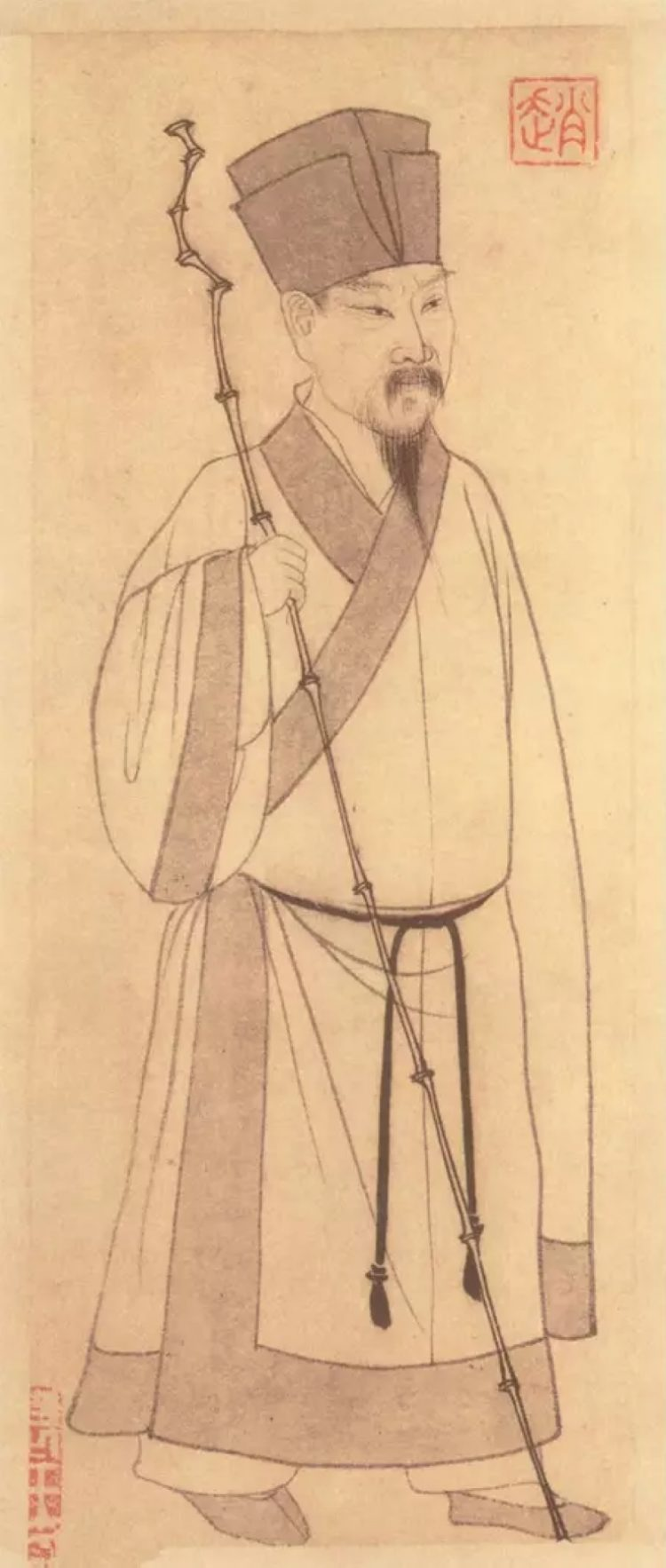
Su Shi, a song dynasty Confucian scholar, wearing the shenyi

In the Song dynasty, Neo-Confucian philosophies determined the conduct code of the scholars which then had a great influence on the lives of the people. Zhu Xi and his Neo-Confucian colleagues developed a new cosmology, moral philosophy, and political principles based on intellectuals and elites sharing responsibility for the dynasty's management.

The Neo-Confucians also re-constructed the meaning of the shenyi, restored, and re-invented it as the attire of the Neo-Confucian scholars in order to distinguish themselves from other scholars who came from school of thoughts. Some Song dynasty scholars, such as Sima Guang and Zhu Xi, made their own version of the scholar gown based on the Liji, while other scholars such as Jin Lüxiang promoted it among his peers. In his Zhuzi jiali (朱子家禮), Zhu Xi described the style of the long garment in considerable detail. However, the shenyi used as a scholar gown was not popular in the Song dynasty and was even considered as "strange garment" despite some scholar-officials appreciated it. Zhu Xi himself hesitated to wear it in public due to the social stigma which were associated to it; Zhu Xi was also accused for wearing strange garments by Shi Shengzu, who also accused Zhu Xi's followers of defying the social conventions. Sima Guang, on the other hand, had the habit to wear the shenyi in private in his garden.

According to philosopher and ancient scholar Lü Dalin (1044–91), noblemen and scholars used the shenyi for informality and ease, whereas commoners wore it as formal clothing. The garment was worn by court officials, noblemen and noblewomen, palace ladies, scholars and their wives, artisans, merchants, and farmers. It was the traditional informal attire of the ancient nobility. The robe became the formal clothing of commoners in the ancient Chinese world, reversing this reasoning. The Song Neo-Confucians praised the robe not only for its elegance and simplicity but also because it represented an essential political function. In the Song dynasty, the shenyi was made with white fabric.

=== Ming dynasty ===
In the Ming dynasty, in line with the attempt of the Hongwu Emperor to replace all the foreign clothing used by the Mongols of Yuan, with the support of the Chinese elites who had supported the military campaigns against the Mongols. The Ming dynasty court thus gave many court commissions to the scholars who then helped enshrine Neo-Confucianism which was exemplified by Zhu Xi's Zhuzi jiali (朱子家禮) as the orthodoxy of the Ming dynasty leading to the sudden rise in popularity of the Confucian shenyi. This form of shenyi had suddenly become a popular form of robe for the scholars in 1368 and also became the official attire of the scholars. Moreover, the shenyi had become a symbol of status and Han ethnicity as it was devoid of all foreign influence and also denoted Chinese intellectual pride and superiority.

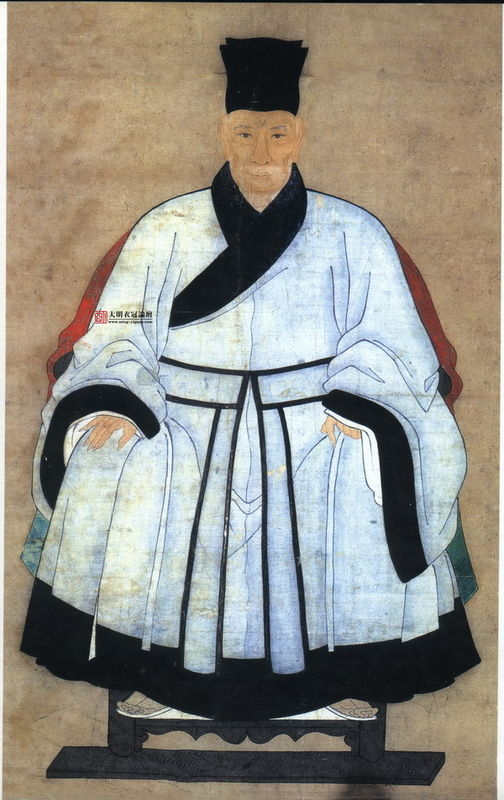
Ming man wearing shenyi

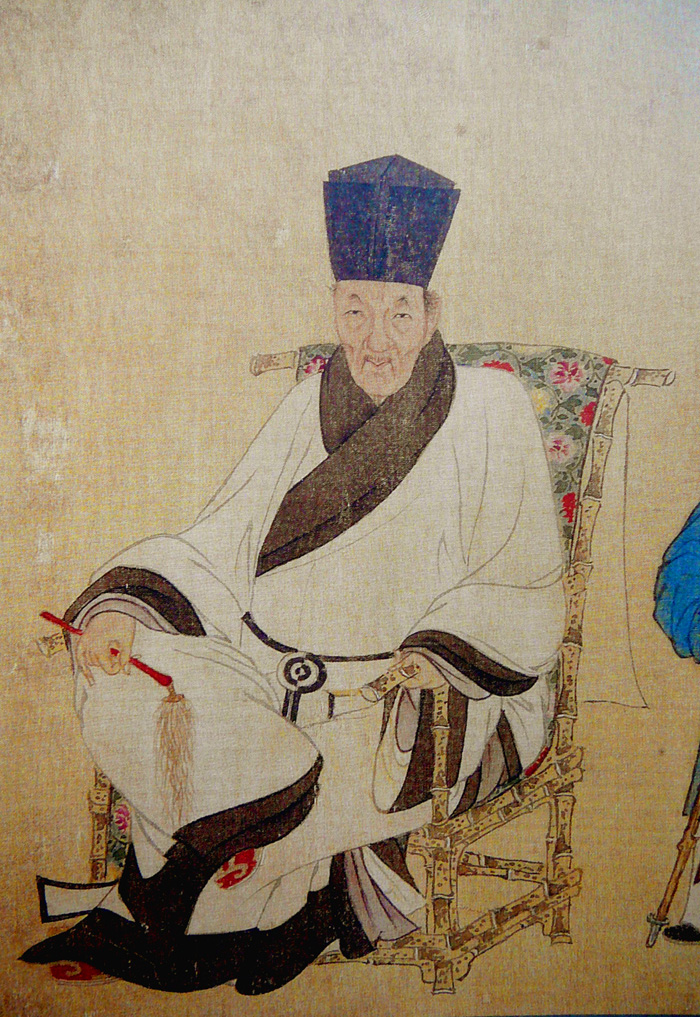
Ming man wearing shenyi

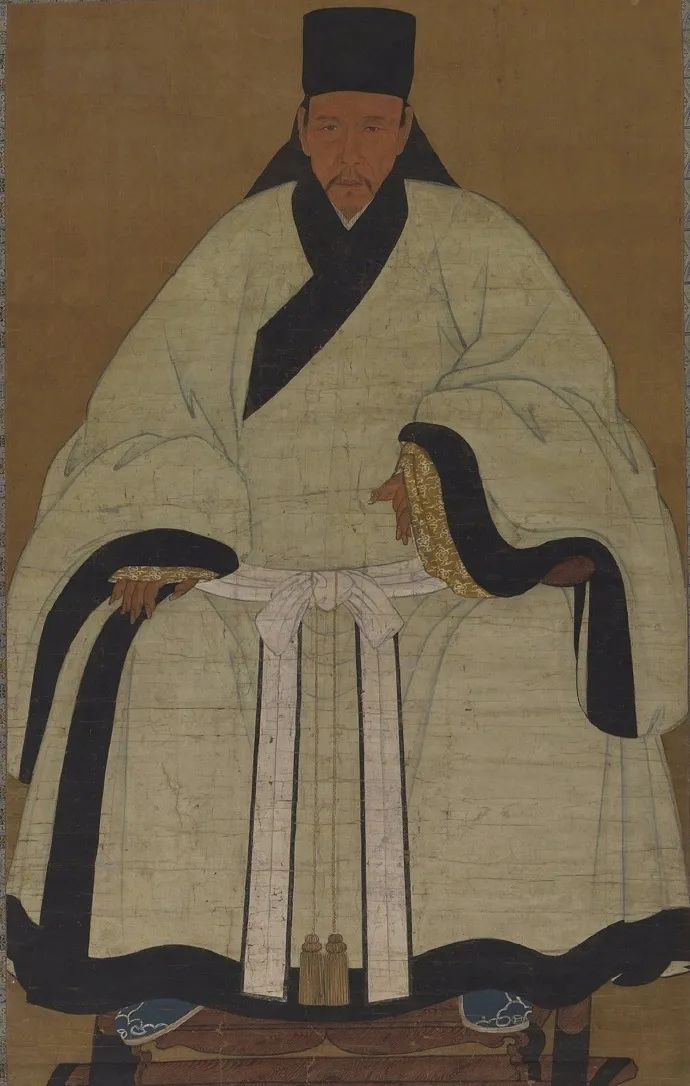
Ming dynasty man wearing shenyi

=== Transition period between the Ming and Qing dynasties ===
The scholar robe's shenyi was a significant topic during the transition period between the Ming dynasty and the Qing dynasty. Huang Zongxi chose Huang Runyu's research version to serve as his contrast. According to Huang Zongxi's research, the scholar's robe shenyi represented the transfer of literati political values instead of dynastic politics and imperial orthodoxy. He said that the scholar's robe's style and function exactly matched the "great implication" (da yi) of literati values. Identifying the specific portion known as ren is the main distinction between these two versions. Ren was casually marked in the center of Huang Runyu's rendition and referred to the entire front piece, folding over the other side. The robe's expanded bottom, known as xuren, was fashionable throughout the Ming dynasty and can be seen in numerous Ming paintings.

On the other hand, Huang Zongxi called ren the collar on the right folding to the left. This definition of ren is narrow and particular, referring to the collar that runs from the neck to the ground. The phrase xuren (continuing the ren) in Records of Rituals refers to the continuance of the collar. Xuren is no longer a name for a robe portion but rather a description of how ren is tailored, according to Huang Zongxi.

== Late 19th century to early 20th century ==
In the 19th century, some members of the gentry class still regarded the shenyi as a Chinese symbol and as having a proper status in society. The Catholic missionaries in the 19th century who visited China perceived Chinese religions (being constituted of the sanjiao) as a degeneration of "true monotheism", widespread superstition, and idolatry while the Protestant missionaries perceived them as being religions with corrupted priesthood, mindless ritualism and idolatry in the Buddhist and Taoist worship. The missionaries also viewed Christianity as being a higher civilizing force than Confucianism. However, this view was not accepted by all the Chinese people, such as Kang Youwei and Cheng Huanzhang.

Kang Youwei, who was an influential advocate of reforms in late Qing dynasty to the early Republican period, rejected the idea that Confucianism was defective when compared to Christianity. Kang Youwei thus wrote a controversial book in 1897, called Kongzi gaizhi kao (孔子改制考; 'Confucius the Reformer'), in which cited the rufu (儒服; 'Confucian robe').

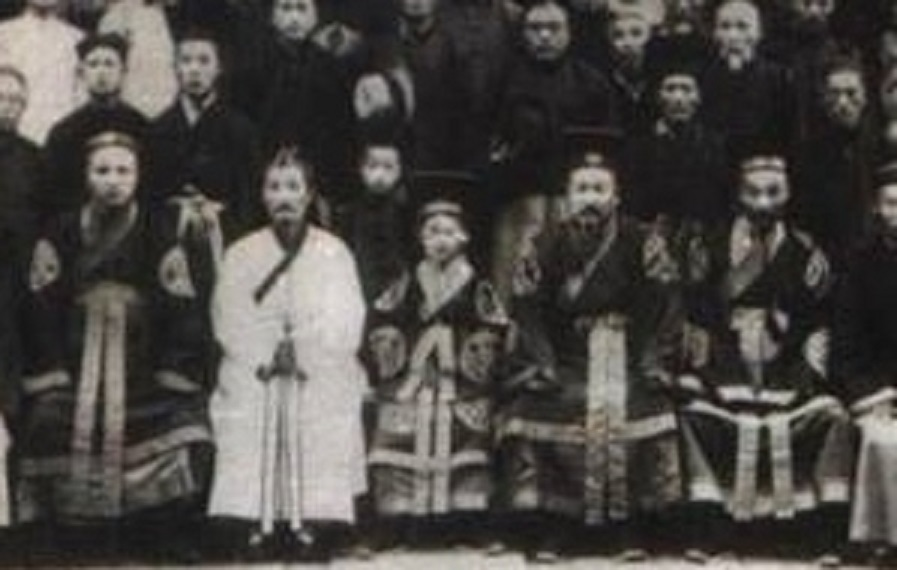
Man wearing the rufu attire consisting of the white Confucian shenyi with cap (front row), 1910s

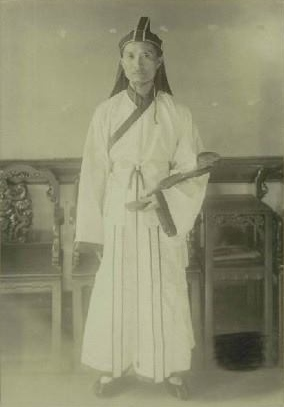
Chen Huanzhang, the founder of the Confucian Religion Association, wearing rufu which consisted of the Confucian shenyi attire and a cap

Cheng Huanzhang, the founder of the Confucian Religion Association (孔教會; Kongjiao hui) in 1912 who also established the zongsheng hui (宗圣会) in Gaoyao in Guangdong, aimed to bring advocates together for the restoration of Confucian texts to the educational curriculum and the official recognition of Confucianism as China's national religion. Thus, in the written by Cheng Huanzhang also wrote the Kongjiaolun, where he argued that the rufu was the clothing attire worn by the Confucianism religion priests. He also listed 12 attributes which were associated with the religiosity of Confucianism: one of these attributes was about rufu, which according to him, was a specific form of attire consisting of the Confucian shenyi and a cap which had been designed by Confucius for his followers to wear. However, despite the support of the prominent literati following the opening of the Kongjiao hui, which had also become the most illustrious and influential organization of its time, the parliament voted to not accord an official recognition to Confucianism as a ‘religion’ in both 1913 and 1916; the parliament gave official institutional status to five religions: Buddhism, Daoism, Catholicism, Protestantism, and Islam, and excluded Confucianism.

== 21st century ==
The shenyi reappeared in the 21st century in China. The ancient-style shenyi in the form of both qujupao and the zhijupao reappeared and is worn by both men and women. In 2003, a man named Wang Letian wore a DIY raojinshenyi on the streets.

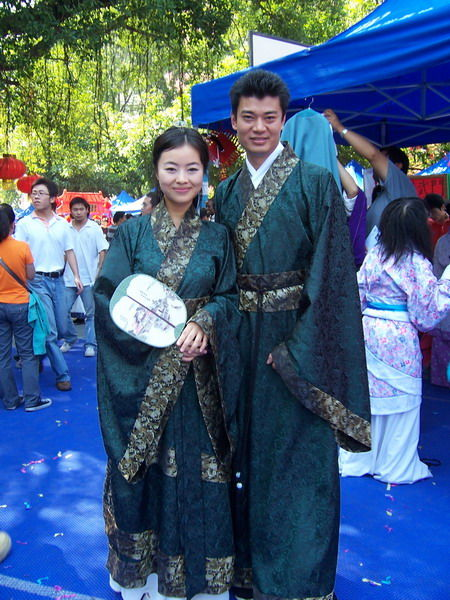
Modern qujupao (left) and modern zhijupao (right) styled based on the designs of the ancient shenyi

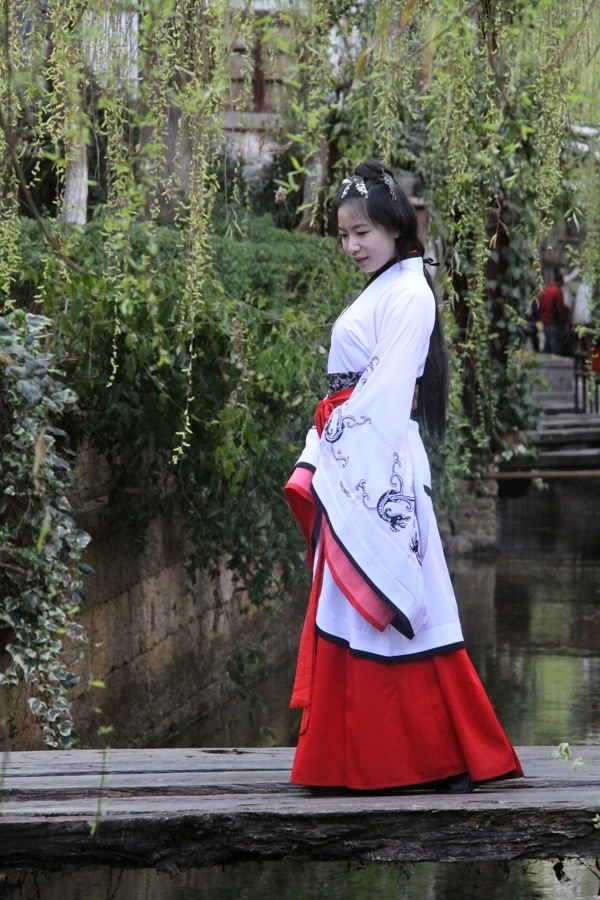
A modern design of the qujupao called xiao quju (小曲裾), a shorter version of the qujupao shenyi

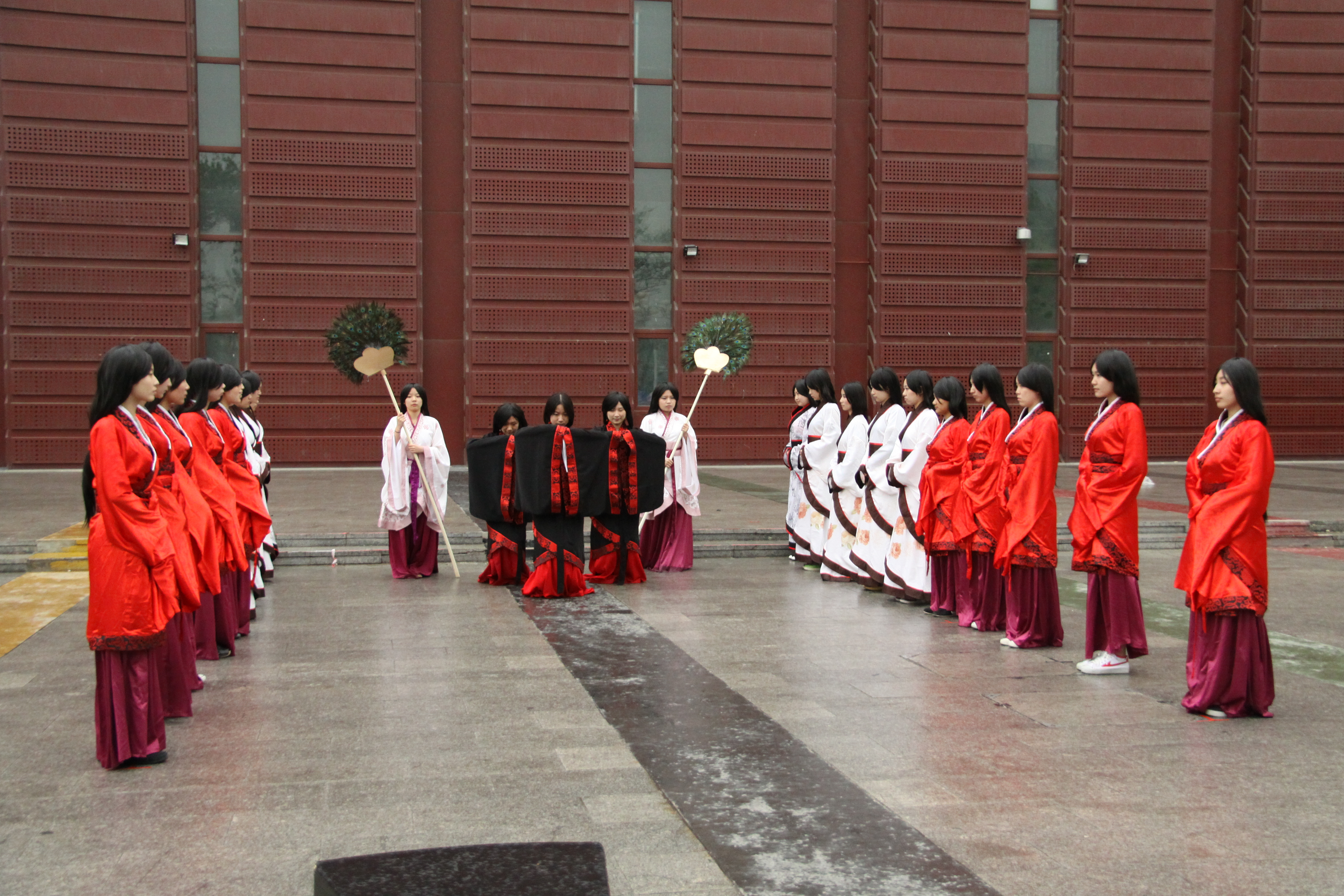
Processions of women wearing qujupao and xiao quju (小曲裾), 2011

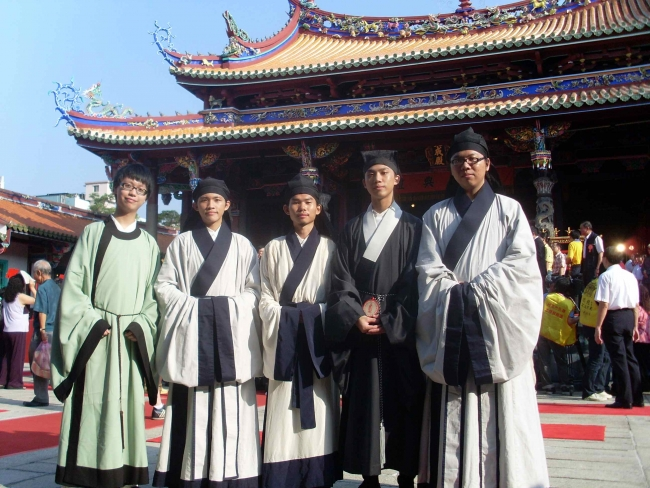
From left to right: Modern lanshan, Confucian shenyi, Confucian shenyi, Zhiduo, Confucian shenyi; designs based on their ancient counterparts

== Types and styles ==
=== Qujupao-style ===
==== Standard qujupao ====
The qujupao was a robe which was long enough to cover the ankles of its wearer; it has an overlapping front lapel which closed on the right side in a style called jiaoling youren; however, its right front piece was cut as a triangular front piece that crossed in front of the body and has rounded under hem. The qujupao would curve and wraps the dress to the back of its wearer allowing the contrasting or decorative edging of the robe would create a spiralling effect when encircling the body. The collar of the qujupao was deliberately made in such ways to prevent any part of its wearer's body from being exposed.

Various forms of the qujupao

Floor-trailing qujupao with narrow trim, large belt, and large and loose sleeves, Warring States period

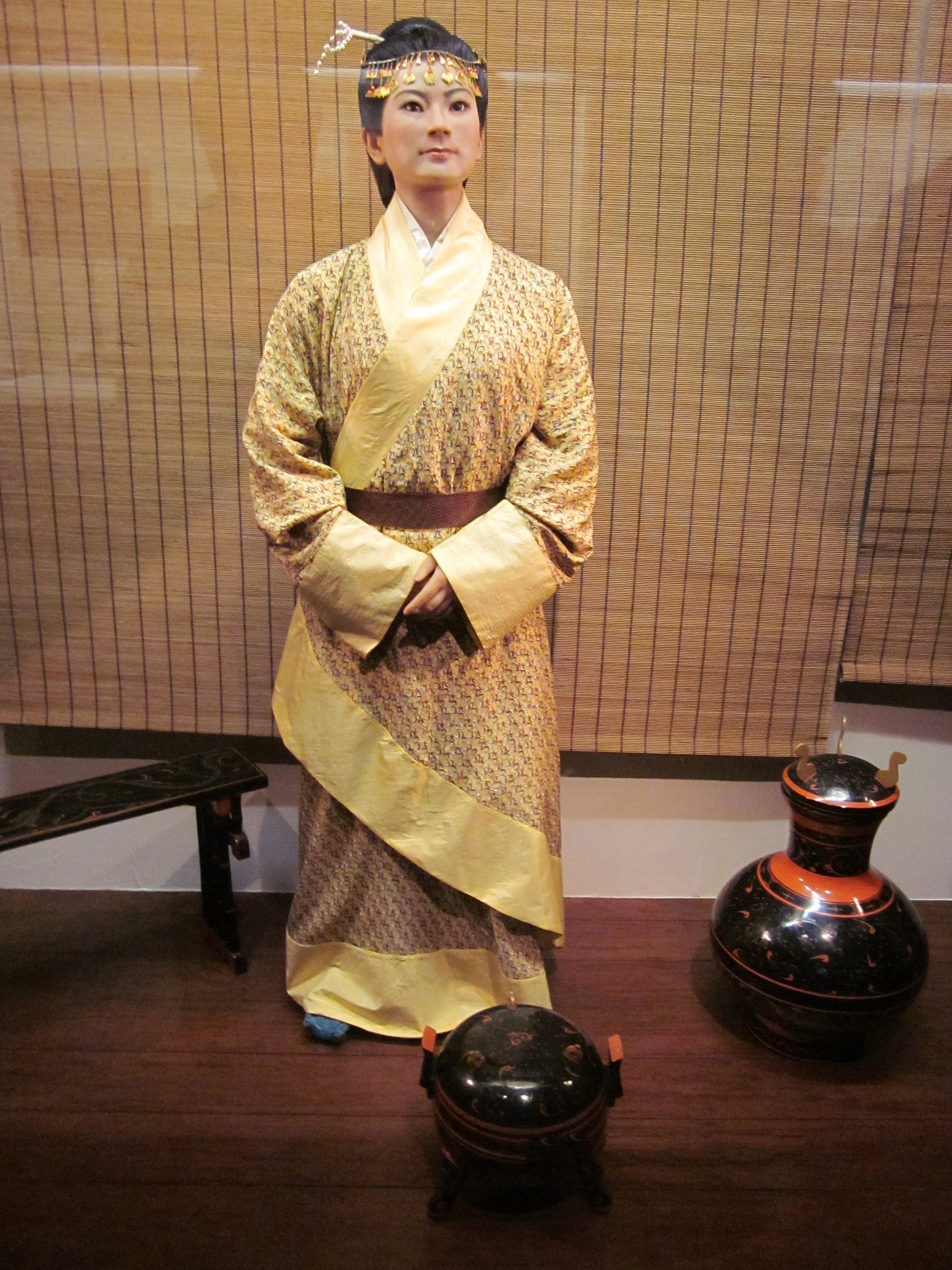
Floor-length qujupao with narrow decorative trim, Western Han dynasty

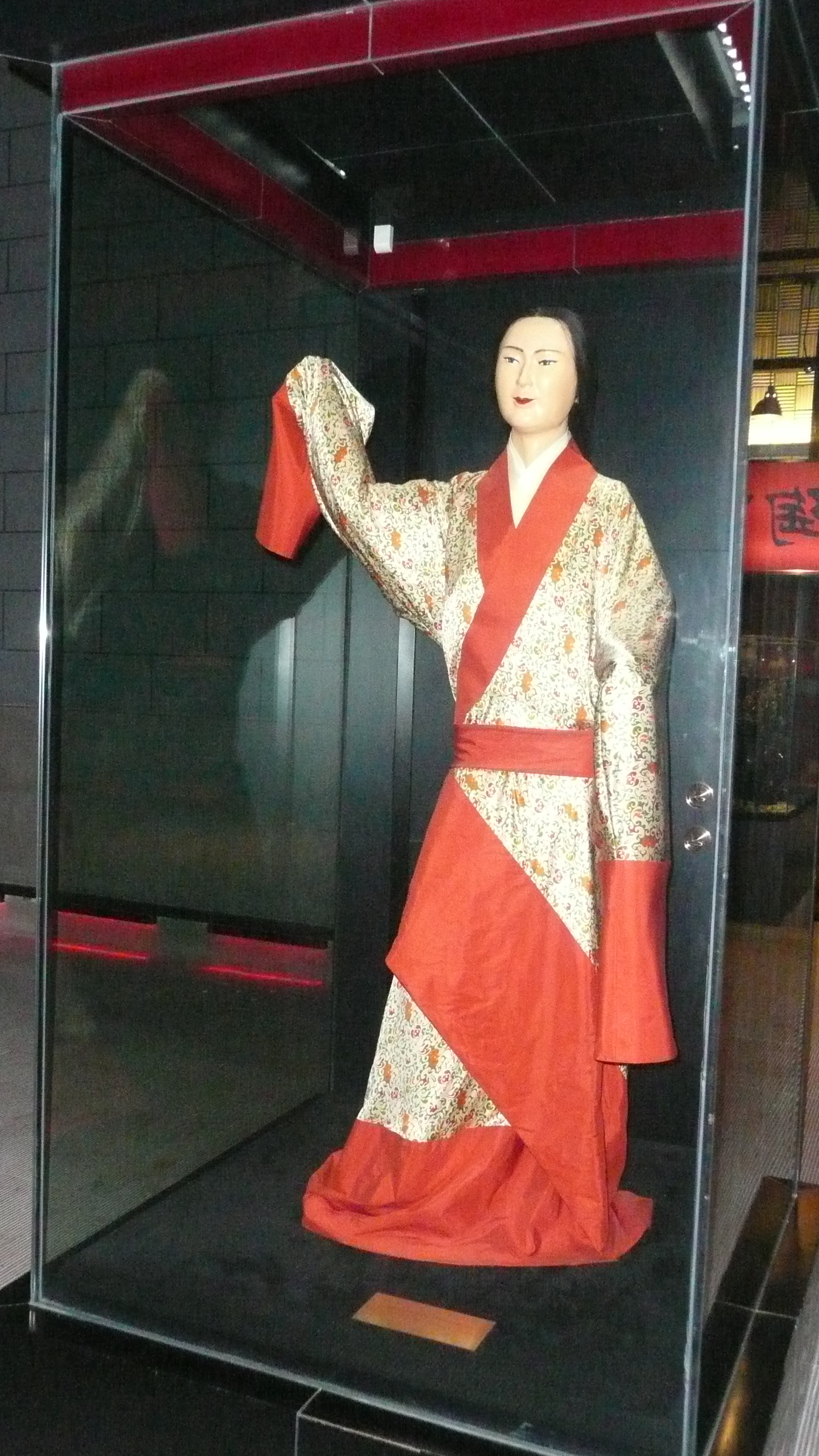
Floor-trailing qujupao with broad decorative trim, tomb of Han Yang Ling, Western Han dynasty

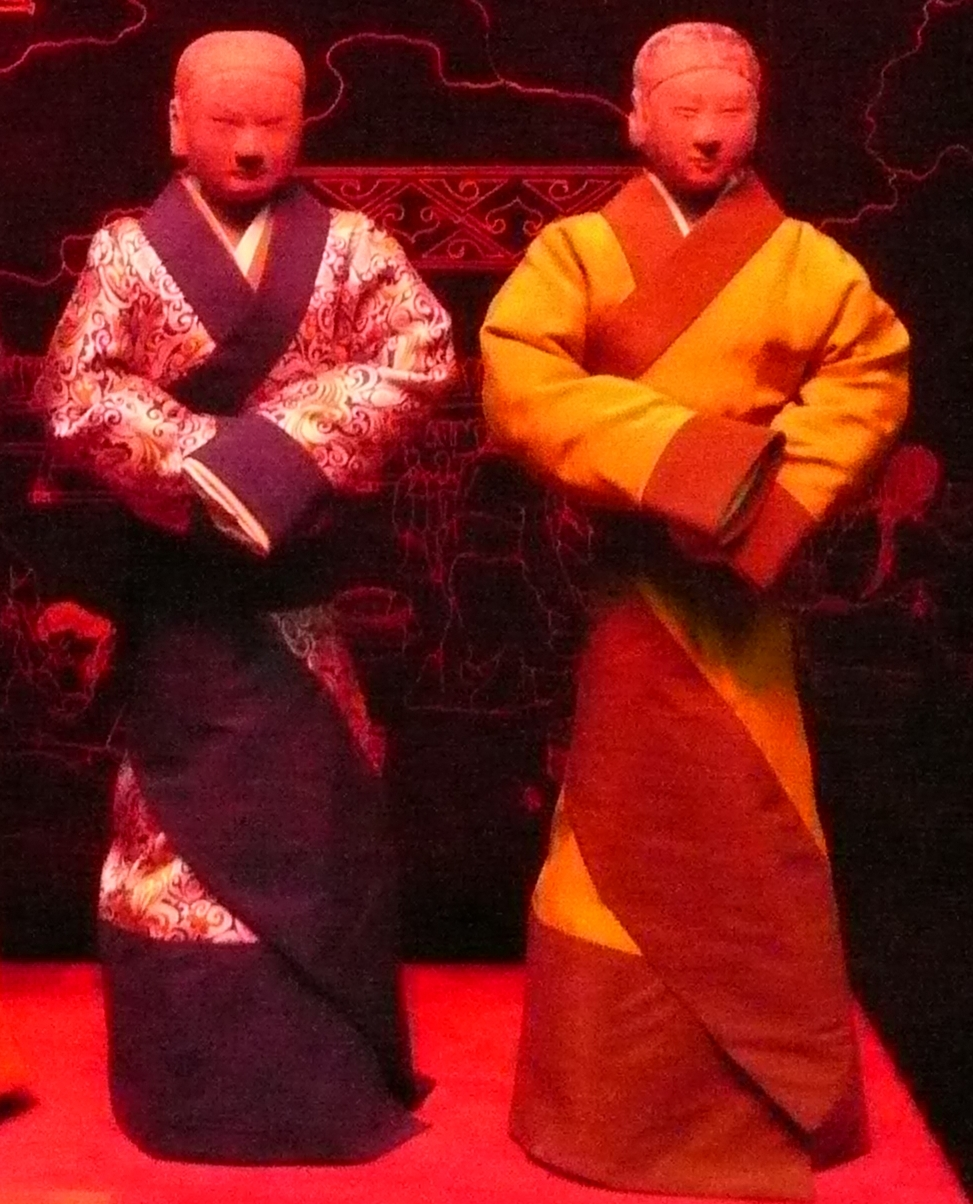
Floor-length qujupao with broad decorative trim, tomb of Han Yang Ling, Western Han dynasty

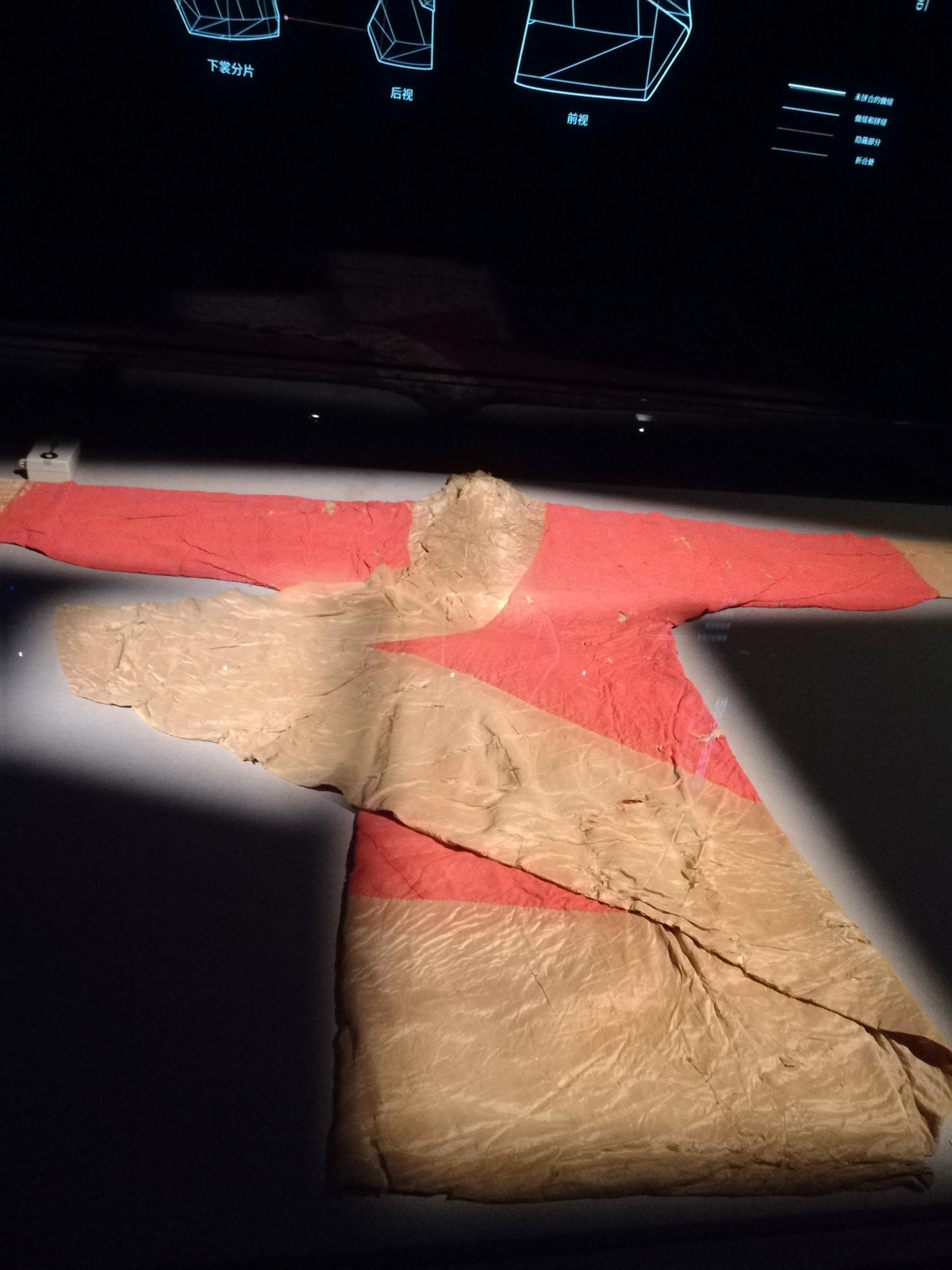
Unearthed quju shenyi

==== Ràojǐn Shēnyī ====
Another type of the qujupao is the Ràojǐn Shēnyī. It can typically be found in the Mawangdui tomb No.1 of the Western Han dynasty. It is characterised by an overlapping, curved front lapel that is long enough to wrap around the entire body. It usually has a silk belt that is tied tightly around the waist and hips to stop the garment from coming loose, which position depends on the length of the garment. The sleeves can be of varying configurations, and the garment can be made to be either loose or fitted.

Forms of Ràojǐn Shēnyī

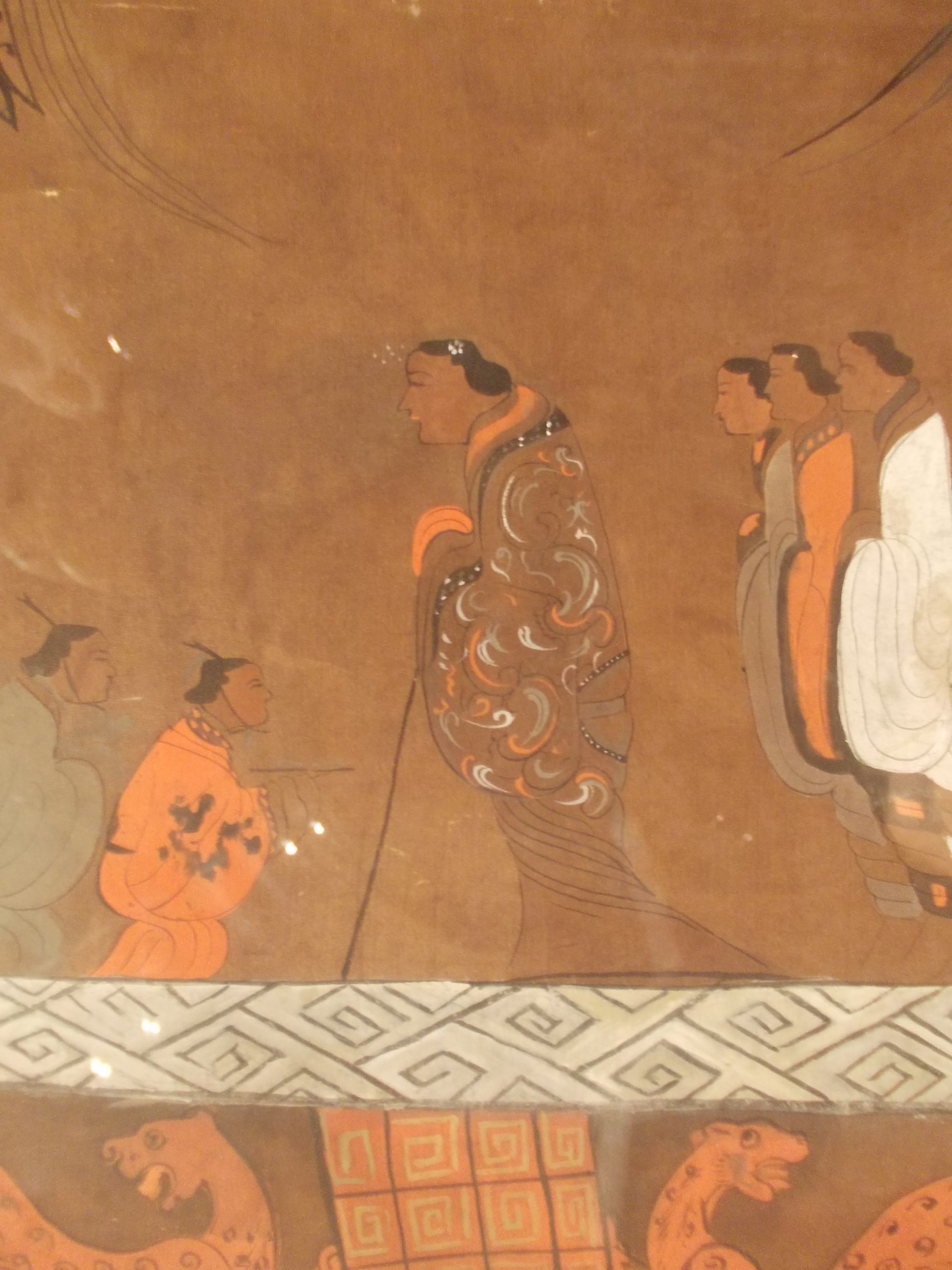
Raojinshenyi with broad and loose sleeves, Western Han dynasty

Modern illustration (front view)

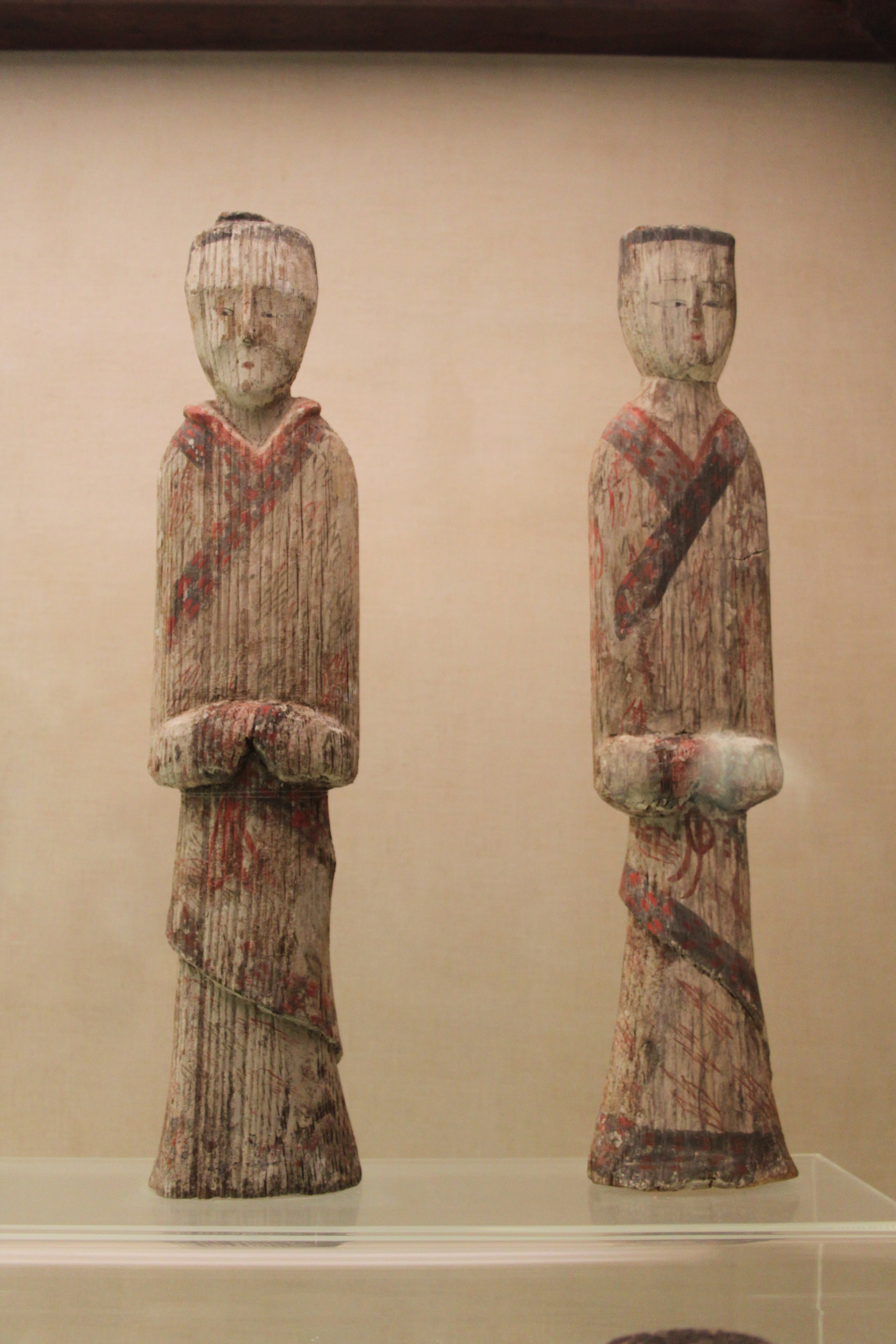
Raojinshenyi with narrow sleeves, Mawangdui tomb, Western Han dynasty

=== Zhijupao-style ===
==== Standard zhijupao ====
The front opening of the zhijupao would fall straight down instead of having a curving front.

Various forms of zhijupao

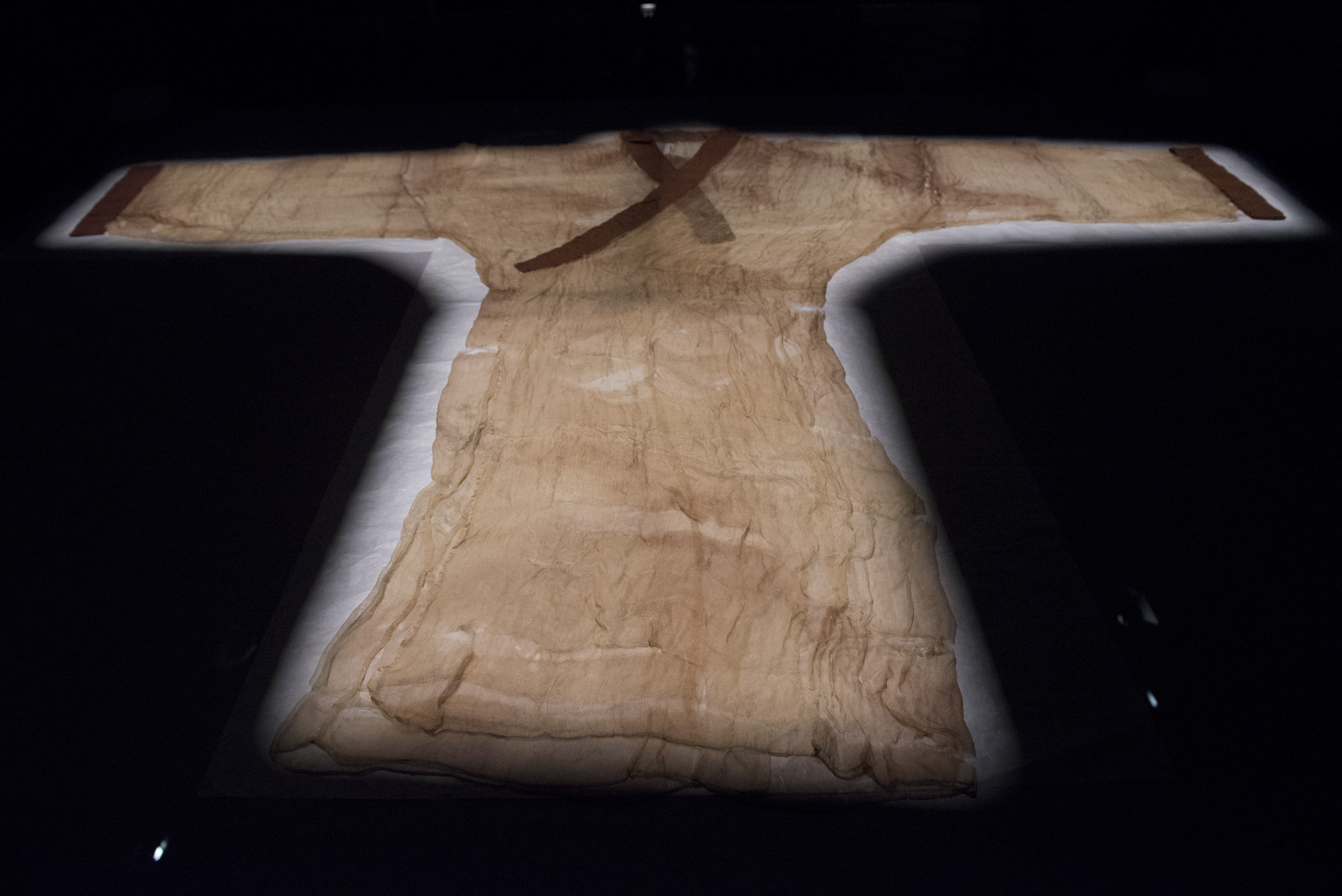
Zhijusushadanyi with broad and loose straight sleeves, Mawangdui tomb, Western Han dynasty

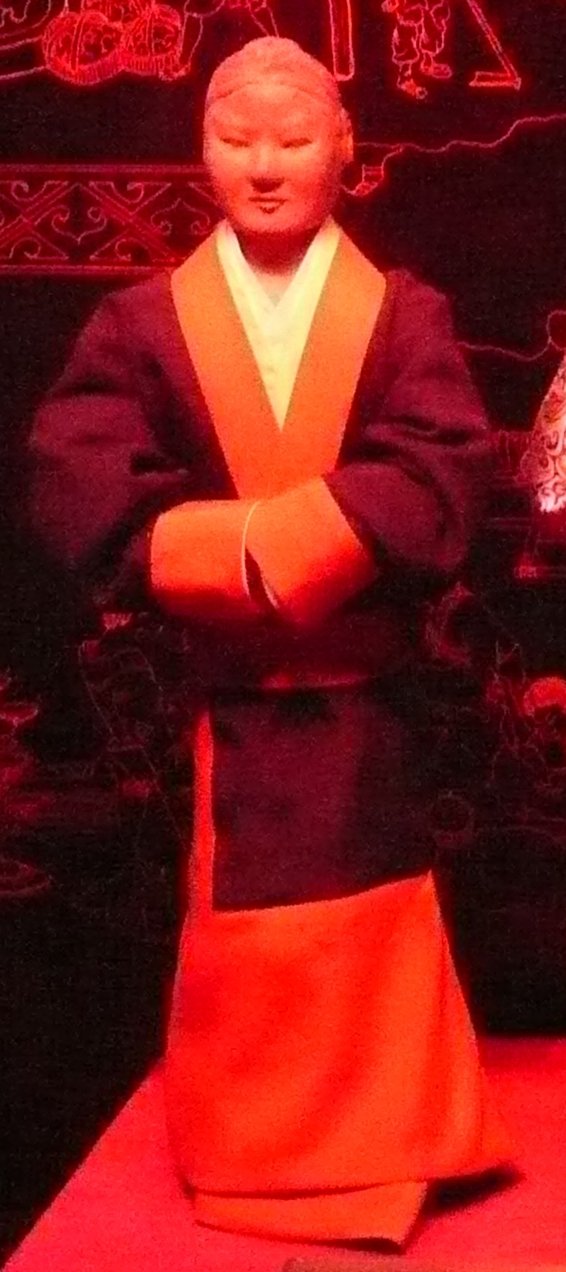
Zhijupao, tomb of Han Yang Ling, Western Han dynasty

==== Confucian shenyi ====
The shenyi in later dynasties directly descended from the shenyi worn in earlier dynasties The shenyi was originally made of ramie cultivated in China. Ramie fabric needs to be bleached and produced 45 to 60 centimetre wide textile.

Similarly to the shenyi worn from Zhou to Han dynasties, the shenyi designed in Song dynasty followed the same principles. The yi (衣; "blouse") and chang (裳; "skirt") of the shenyi is sewn together. The upper part is made up of 4 panels of ramie fabric, representing four seasons of a year. 2 panels are fold and sewn to cover the upper body. Another 2 panels of ramie fabric are sewn onto each side of the yi as two sleeves. The lower part is made up of 12 panels of fabric sewn together (十二片縫合), representing 12 months a year. Its sleeves are wide with black cuff. It is also tied with a wide belt called dadai (大帶) is tied in the front. According to the Japanese scholar Riken Nakai's shenyi template, there are four design features of the Shenyi dressing: upper and lower connections, square collar, length to the ankle, and additional coverage. In the Song dynasty, the shenyi was made with white fabric.

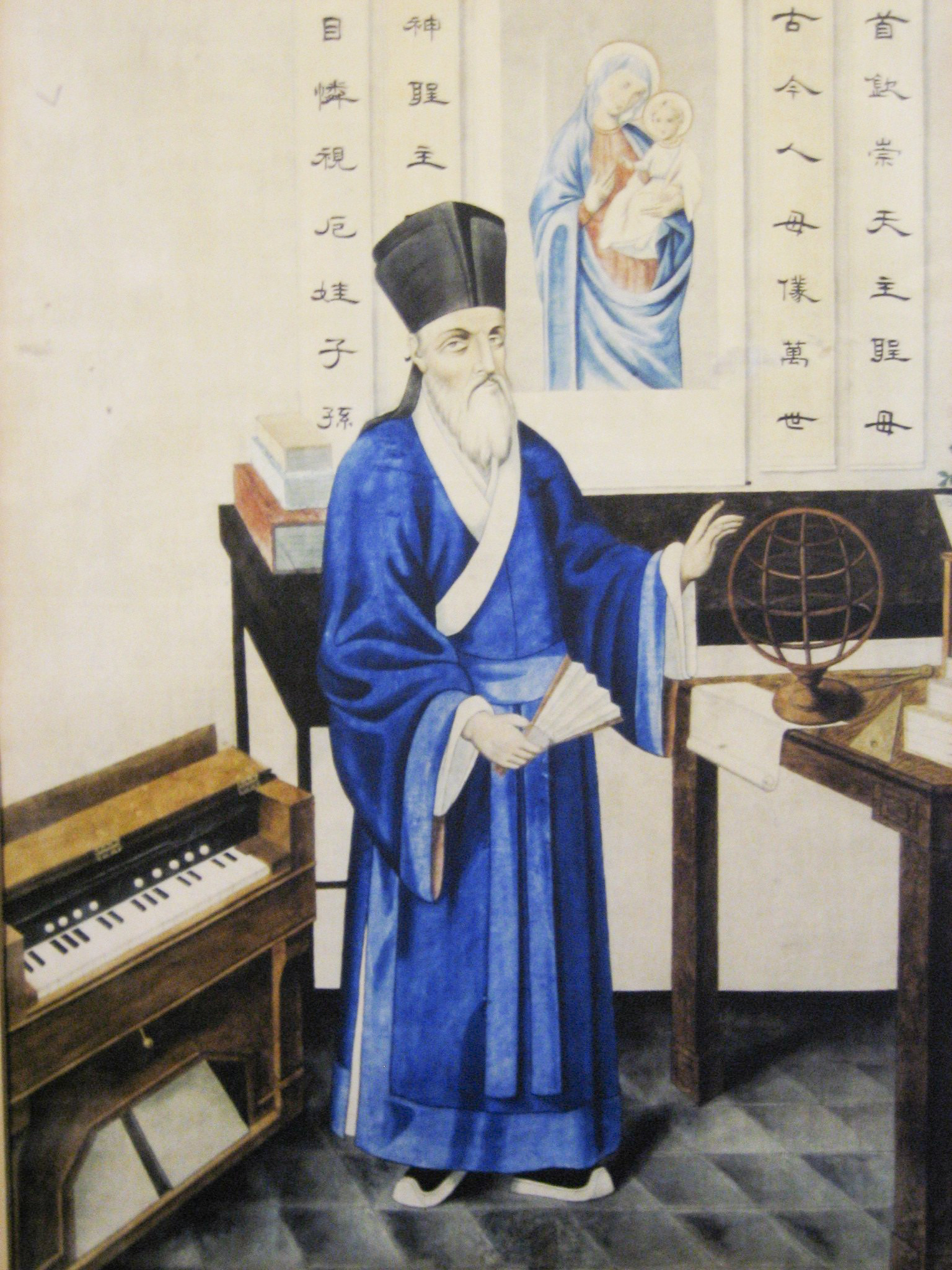

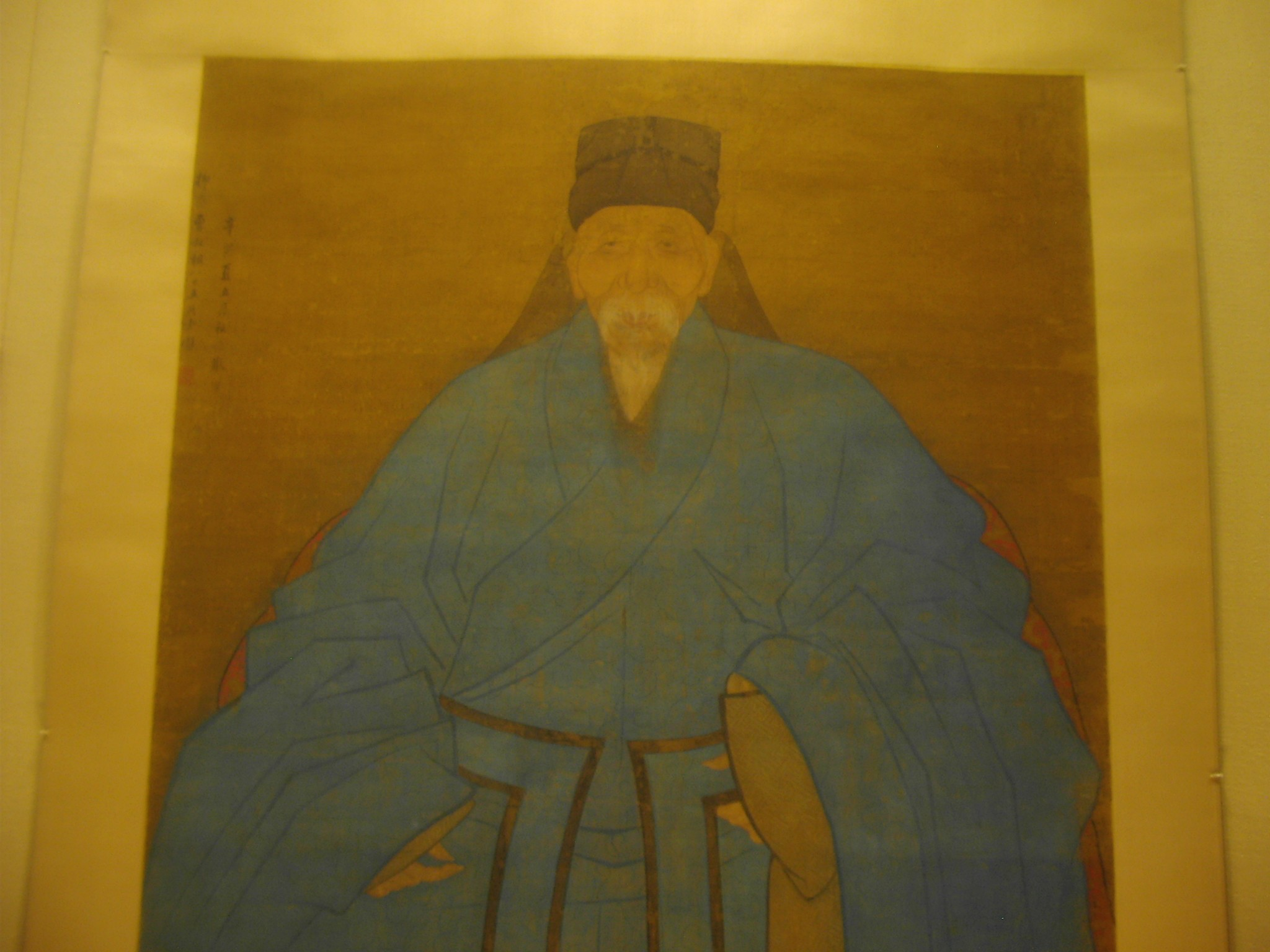

Illustration of dadai belt, from the Chinese encyclopedia Gujin Tushu Jicheng, section "Ceremonial Usages"

==== Diyi ====
The Diyi was a set of attire which was worn as ceremonial clothing; a shenyi was also part of the diyi.

== Influences and derivatives ==
=== Korea ===
In Korea, the shenyi is called simui (Korean: 심의; Hanja: 深衣). It was introduced from China in the middle of Goryeo; however, the exact date of its introduction is unknown. The simui was worn as an outer garment by the seonbi. The seonbi in Joseon imitated the clothing attire designed by Zhu Xi, i.e. the shenyi and the literati hat. The seonbi, who valued the simui greatly, embraced it as a symbol of Confucian civilization, and continued to publish treatise on the simui starting from the sixteenth century AD. The simui also influenced other clothing, such as the cheollik, the nansam, and hakchangui.

The simui is white and in terms of design, it has wide sleeves and is composed on an upper and lower part which is attached together (衣裳連衣; Uisangyeonui) at the waistline; the lower part has 12 panels which represents 12 months. It is a high-waist robe and a belt (大帶; dadae) is tied to the simui. There were also various forms of simui which developed in the Joseon.

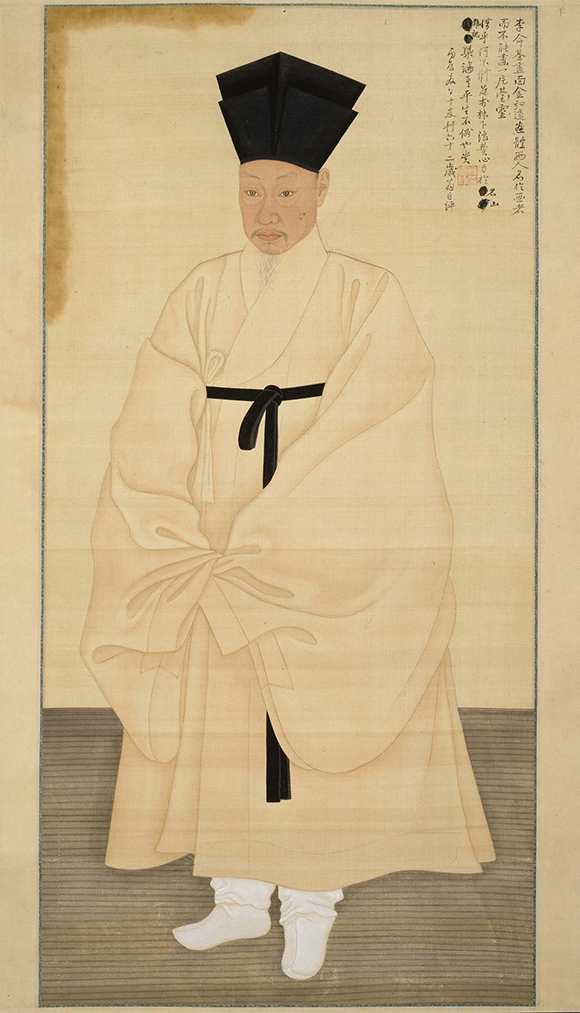
Korean Confucian scholar Seo Jik-su

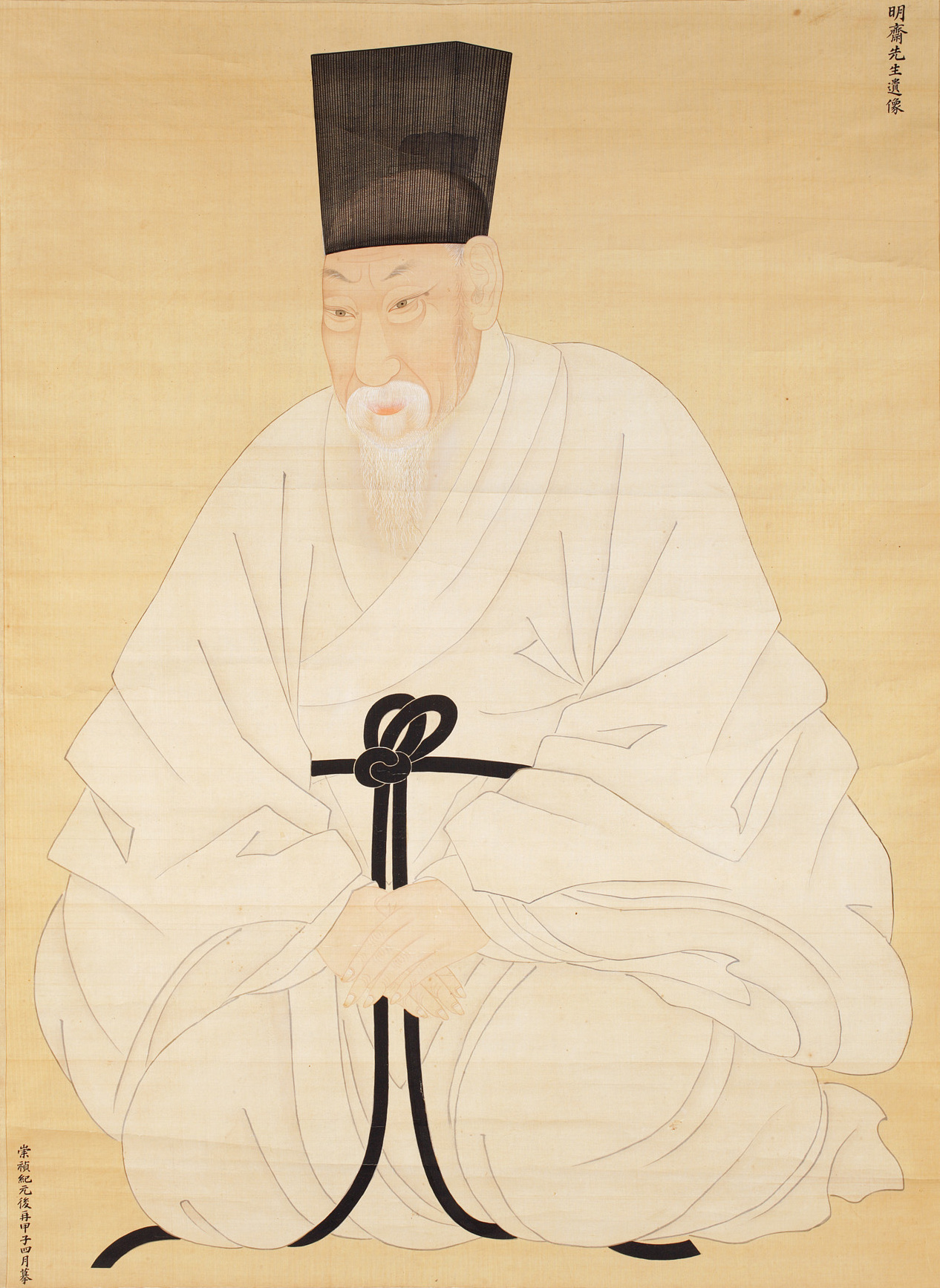
Korean Confucian scholar Yun Jeung

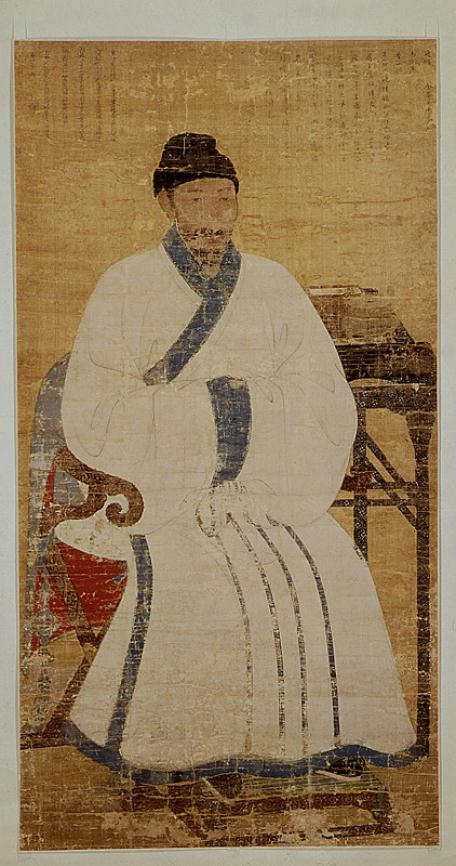
Korean Confucian scholar Yi Che-hyŏn

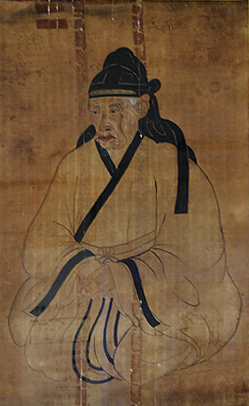
Korean Confucian scholar Song Si-yŏl

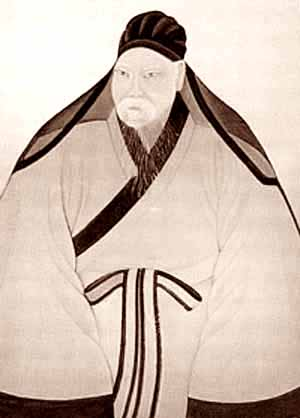
Korean Confucian scholar Pak Chiwŏn

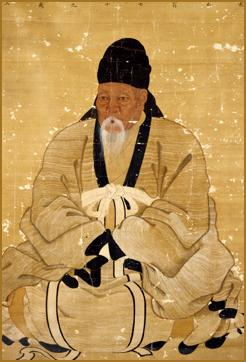
Korean Confucian scholar Kwon Sang-ha

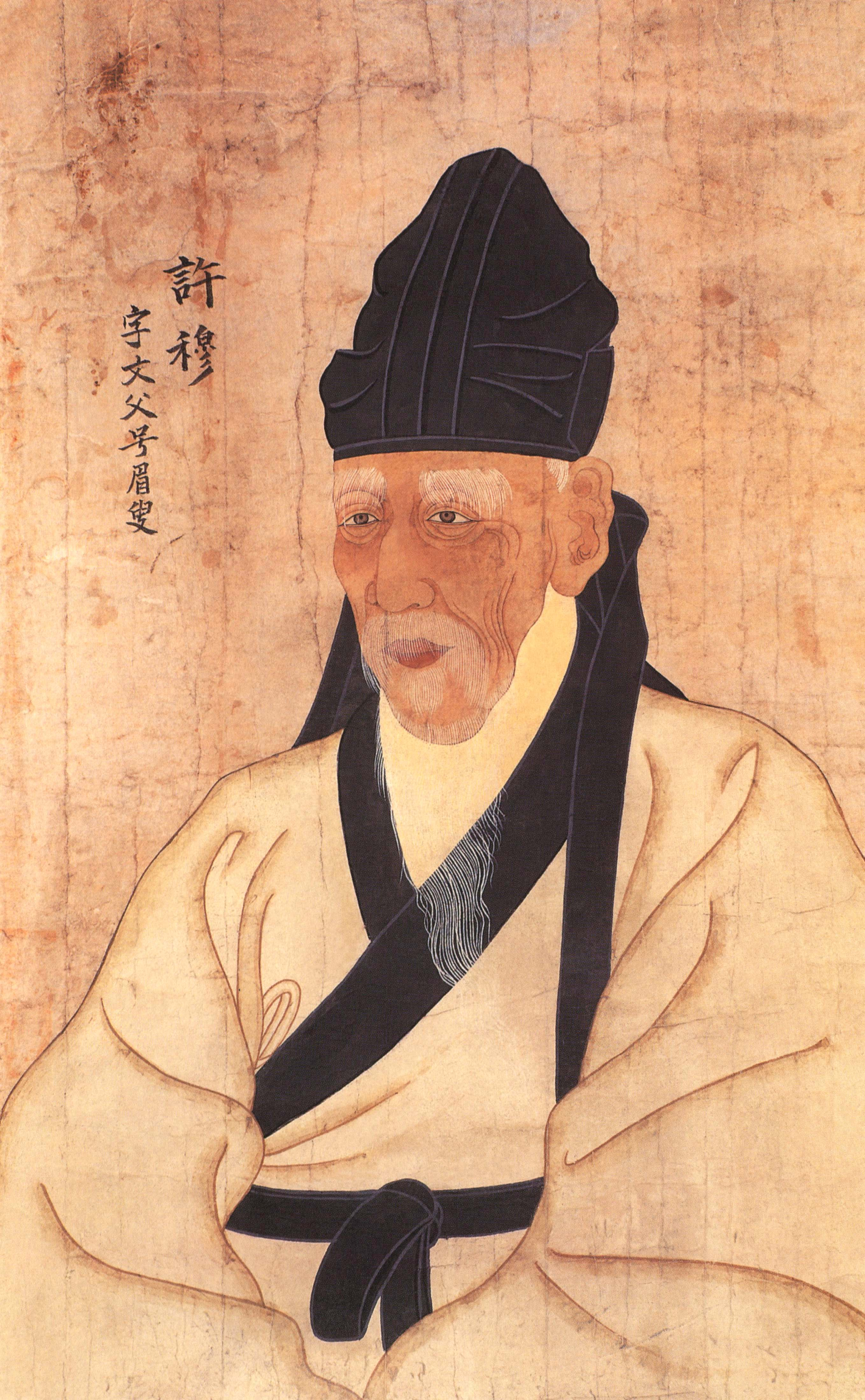
Korean Confucian scholar Hŏ Mok

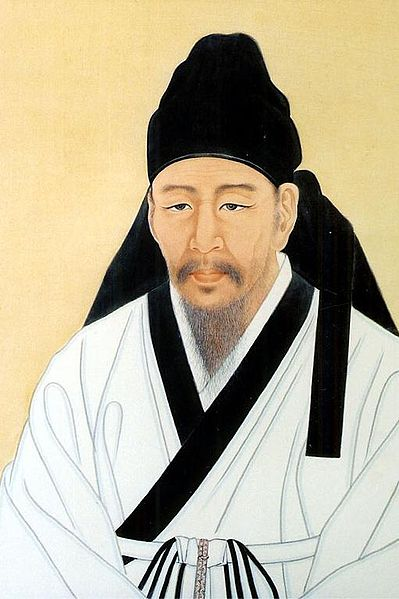
Korean Confucian scholar Kim Chong-jik

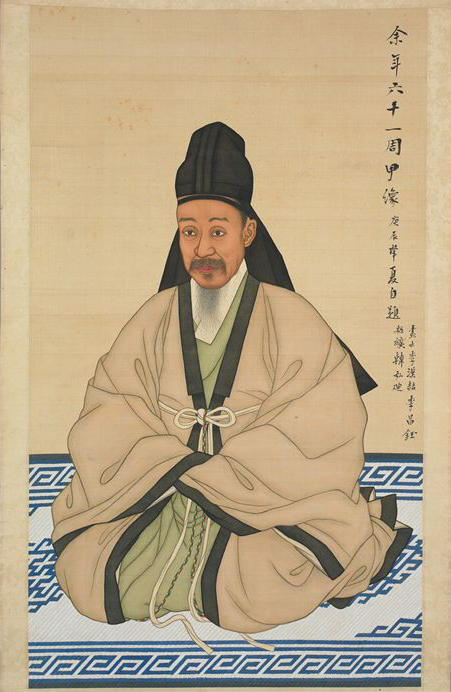
Heungseon Daewongun

=== Japan ===
The early Tokugawa period in Japan, some Japanese scholars, such as Seika Fujiwara and Hayashi Razan, who self-proclaimed themselves as followers of Zhu Xi wore the Confucian shenyi and gave lectures in it.

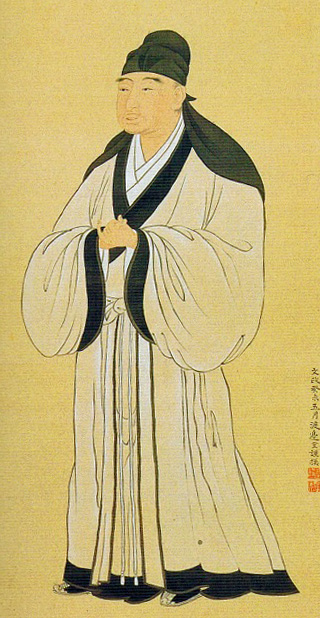
Fujiwara Seika, an Edo Confucian scholar, in the Confucian shenyi and fujin

Seika Fujiwara, was usually perceived as the patriarch of the Japanese Neo-Confucian movement during the Tokugawa period. Seika used to be a Buddhist monk before turning to Confucianism and probably renounced Buddhism in the year 1594.

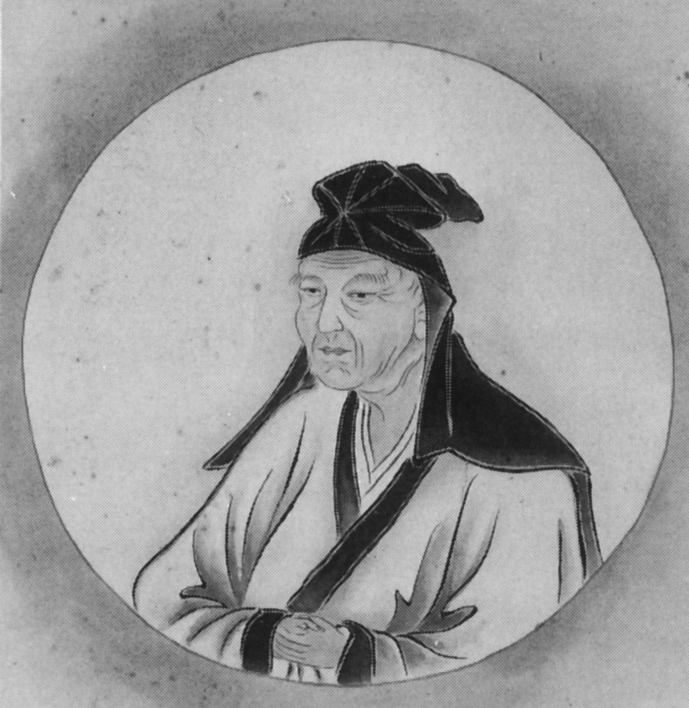
Hayashi Razan, an Edo Confucian scholar, wearing the Confucian shenyi and fujin

According to his biographer and follower, Hayashi Razan, Seika even appeared in front of Tokugawa Ieyasu in 1600 dressed in the Chinese-style Confucian shenyi and fujin which were prescribed for rituals by Zhu Xi; this event also marked the beginning of the popularity of Confucianism in Japan.

=== Vietnam ===
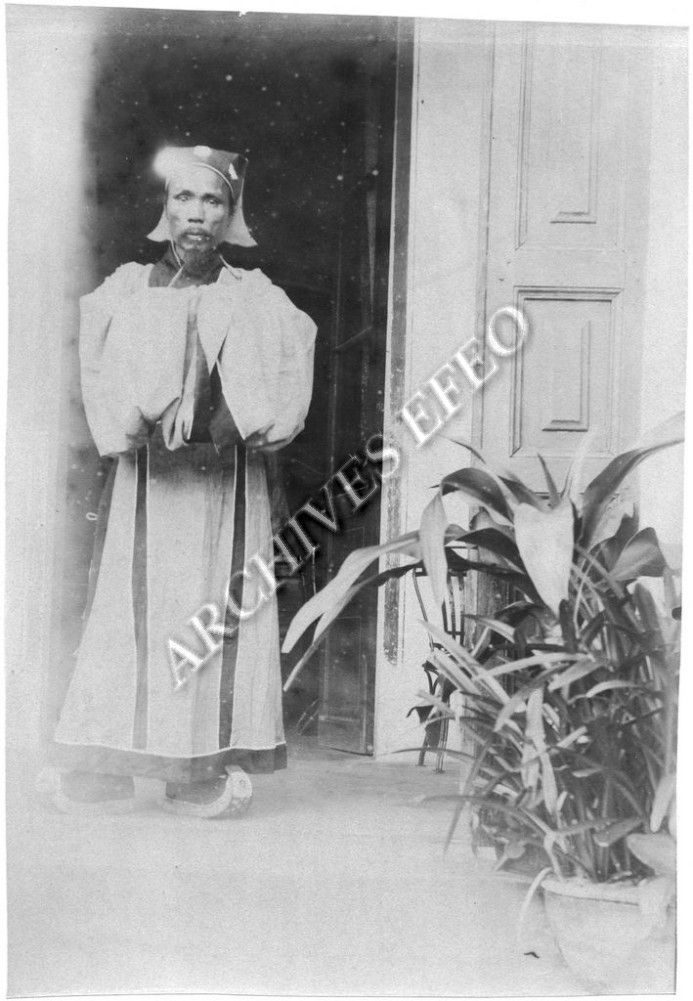
A Confucian during the Nguyễn dynasty wearing a blue shenyi (thâm y).

Photographs from the Nguyễn dynasty (1802–1945) indicate that shenyi robes continued to be worn till the end of the dynasty. These robes were only worn in Confucian ceremonies.

== Similar looking garments ==
- Daopao
- Paofu
- Tieli
- Zhiduo

== See also ==
- Hanfu
- List of Hanfu
- Panling lanshan
