= Hakchangui =

Traditional Korean clothes for scholars

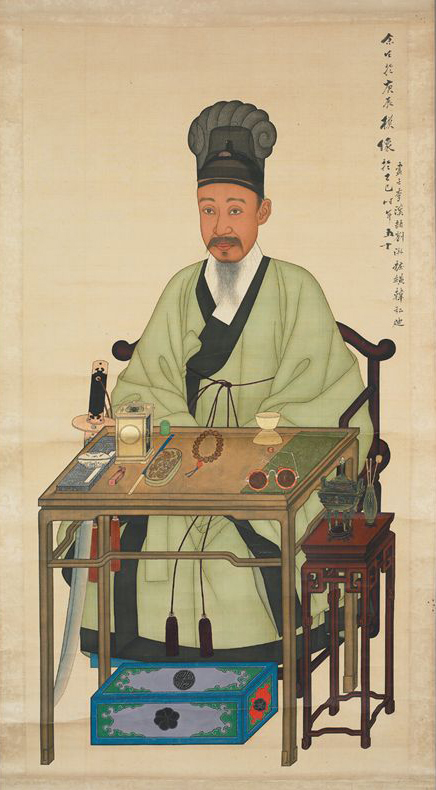

Korean name
- Hangul: 학창의
- Hanja: 鶴氅衣
- RR: hakchangui
- MR: hakch'angŭi

The hakchangui (Korean: 학창의; Hanja: 鶴氅衣; lit. crane coat) is a traditional type of Korean clothes (hanbok 한복) used by scholars as school uniforms in the 17th-century and 18th-century. It was introduced from the Chinese hakchang during the Joseon period in the 17th and 18th century and gradually became popular.

Although there is a lack of literature and conversational materials on Hakchangui. It is possible to find examples of students wearing school uniforms during the 17th and 18th centuries through literature and painting materials. Hakchangui was the clothing of the Taoists. Portraits and literature of Kim Seon, Kwon Seop, and Nam Do-jin confirmed that "Hakchangui" was also used as a clothing symbolizing scholars who escaped from power and lived a life of the world. This type of clothing can be traced to the Joseon dynasty, and were used by scholars and officials, as shown in various portraits like the one that shows General Jang Man.

== Description ==
It is said that the Taoists performed the Taoist ceremony at the restoration palace, which is the conduit, and that the Goryeo masters wore a uniform made of white cloth, but with wide sleeves.

Hakchang, called the clothes of the gods, was worn by virtuous scholars, wrapped around the edges, and tied up with a vast royal band (sejo-dae 세조대). The scrolls were all blocked, meaning that in the Four Godfathers, ordinary people wore outerwear as a base for their outerwear. Due to the reform of the agenda of the Gabo-gyeongjangjang, ordinary clothes were covered with a scroll of cloth.

Generally, Hakchanguis were fastened by tying them with small strings and using a single bead to secure them.

It can be found with black lines circling around the edges of daechanges, it is common to explain that black lines are surrounded by feathers, seop, plumes, side slits, and backtits. In addition to the fact that the same type of clothing in the 18th century was hung up and down with a ring bead on the impactful part without covering the collar. There are wide sleeves and narrow sleeves, and there are sleeveless ones and sleeved ones. On blue, white, yellow, and black backgrounds, there are wide ones and some narrow ones. There are black and blue kites, so the standard is not set. The clothes were cut straight and hung down, and the front was long and the back was short.

== History ==
=== 17th century ===
The distinctive feature that the Hakchangui had in the 17th century is that the collar of Joseon's 17th century school meets in the middle of two collars and forms a Y-shaped shape. The 17th century Joseon Hakchangui was the same Y-shaped daegeum-shaped collar as that of China. The formality of opening the school uniform is to use a button or a pole, the Hakchang and Hakchangui borrowed from China in the first half of the 17th century can be seen in the same form of clothing as that of Zhuge Liang.

The method of connecting seems to have sewed the lines of the left and right front roads first and sewed the collar onto them. This shows the difference between the 17th century Joseon's school flag. In addition, Chinese school uniforms were decorated with beads, and the shapes of the beads varied, suggesting that they were carved according to individual tastes.

When the collar was enlarged in the school's wearing portrait, the sewing line was not identified, so the width of the collar was the same as the width of the line in the left and right directions, indicating that the collar and the line were connected in one. As such, the collar of Joseon's 17th century school was clearly different from that of China's 17th and 18th centuries. The closure method was either tied with small pus or wrapped with a single bead, and the beads used in Joseon's school uniforms appeared to have used various forms of beads, such as China.

=== 18th century ===
In the 18th century, Josin's hakchangui was a straight, ruffled, square-shaped garb with no overlapping left and right hem. Lines were put on the collar, ruffles, and cuffs, and a button was attached to the head of the collar to fasten it. In general, it looked like a Chinese dean, so it was an unfamiliar form to the students of high school, and it is thought that not many people wore school uniforms. It was worn mainly by scholars who had exchanges with China, and it is gradually spreading around the students who follow the teachings of the teacher who wore the school uniform or those who like antique things.

It is presumed that by the 18th century, Joseon's school spirit was transformed into a 'ghost school creation' influenced by the flag of Chinese academic creativity. In the late 17th century and early 18th century, the school buttons were mixed with bead-type and knot-type buttons, and two or four more knot-type buttons appeared to have been used since the end of Choi Jin (1642-1708)

== See also ==
- Bokgeon
- Shenyi/ simui
- Panling lanshan/ namsam
- Hechang - Chinese Crane-cloak
