= Yingluo (ornament) =

Traditional Chinese ring-like necklace of Buddhist origins

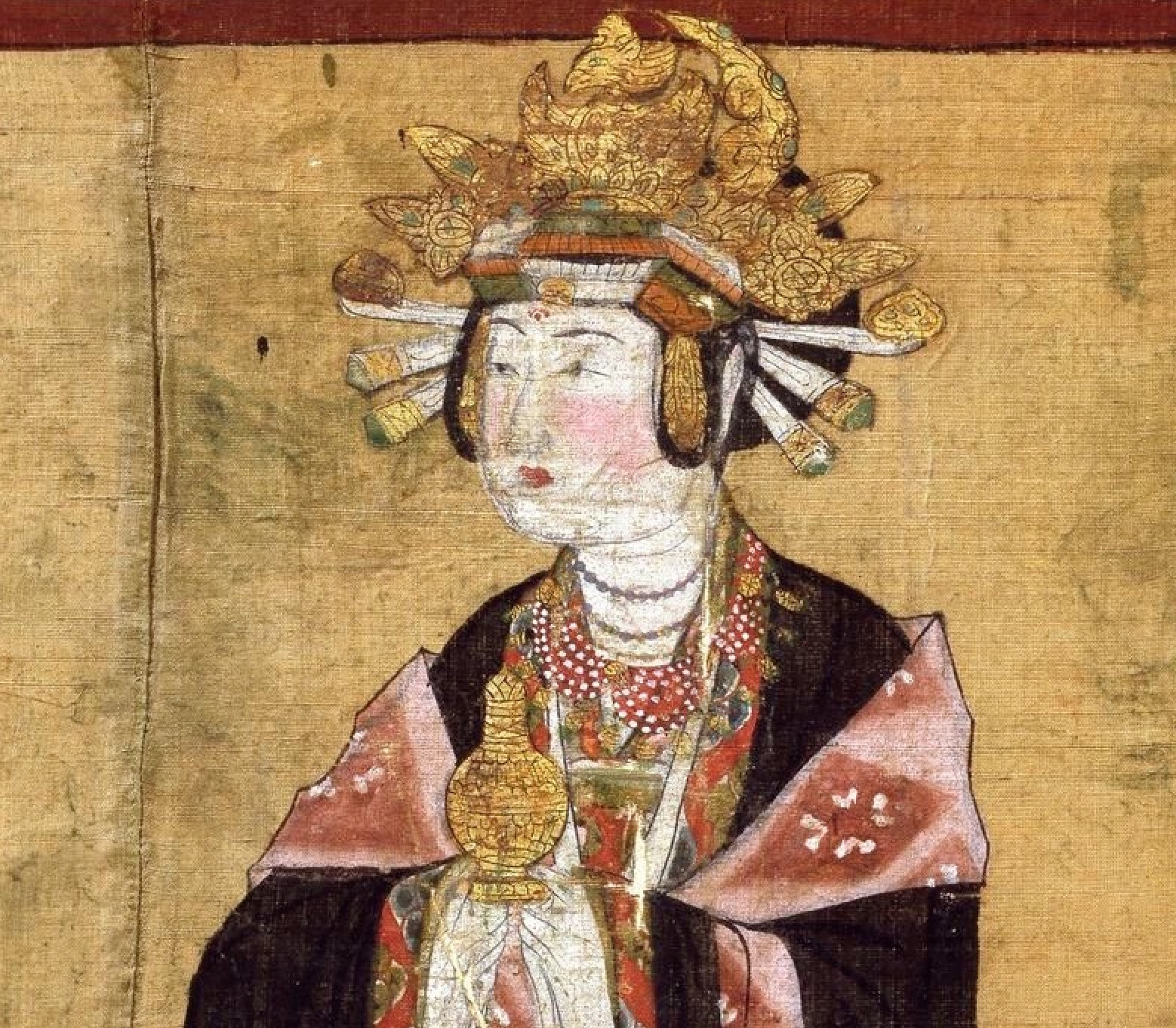
- Portrait of a donor wearing yingluo, Mogao grotto no. 17, 983 AD

Chinese name
- Traditional Chinese: 瓔珞
- Simplified Chinese: 璎珞
Transcriptions
Standard Mandarin
- Hanyu Pinyin: Yīngluò

Japanese name
- Kanji: 瓔珞
Transcriptions
- Romanization: Yōraku

Yingluo (simplified Chinese: 璎珞; traditional Chinese: 瓔珞; also written as 缨络; 纓絡; from the word keyūra in Sanskrit which was transliterated into jiyouluo (积由罗) in China) is a ring-shaped neck ornament or fashion jewellery of Buddhist origins in ancient China with its earliest prototypes having roots in ancient India. In China, the yingluo was first used as a Buddhist ornament in Buddhist decorative arts, including sculptures and paintings such as the Dunhuang frescoes. The yingluo depicted as decorative Buddhist art elements and was later imitated and turned into an actual elegant necklace by the Tang dynasty. It was then widely adopted as a classical necklace in Chinese society for centuries and as a head-wear. It was also used the hanfu of Chinese women where it was used as a neck ornament or jewellery, and was especially favoured by the Chinese court ladies in ancient times. The yingluo could also be used as a textile pattern which would applied on Chinese clothing. The yingluo gradually lost popularity as it lost its appeal due to the changes in people's sense of aesthetic and aesthetic needs in modern times. However, it currently continues to be worn as a common modern-day hanfu accessory by Hanfu enthusiasts since the Hanfu movement and can appear in various styles and materials.

== Construction and design ==
=== Yingluo jewellery ===
The yingluo is a ring-shaped necklace. As a necklace, it comes in various styles and shapes. It was generally made of gold, jade, pearls, and other precious materials. It also often featured suspended beads combined with auspicious trinkets or motifs rooted in Chinese culture.

Chinese yingluo

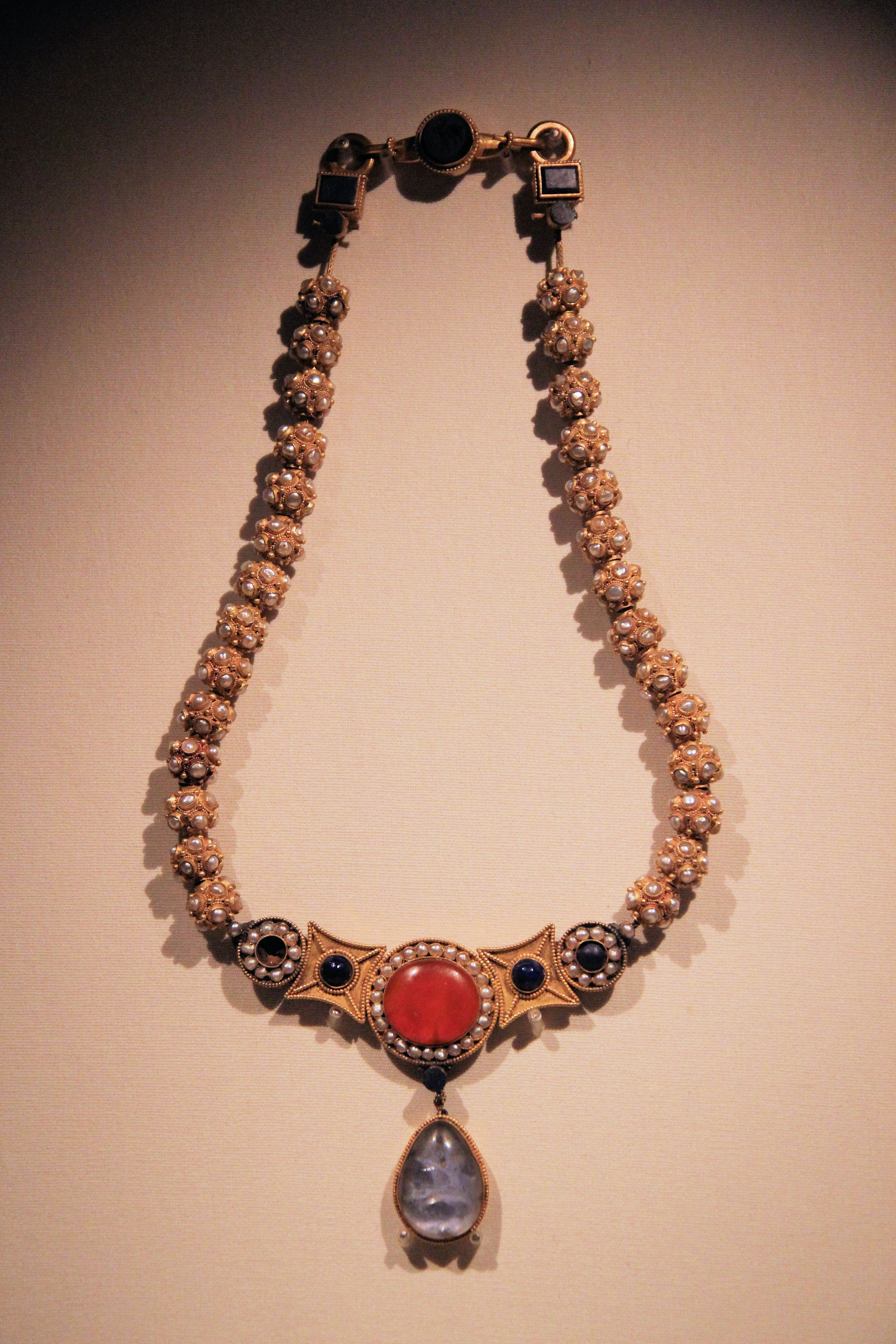
A style of yingluo, unearthed from a Tang dynasty tomb

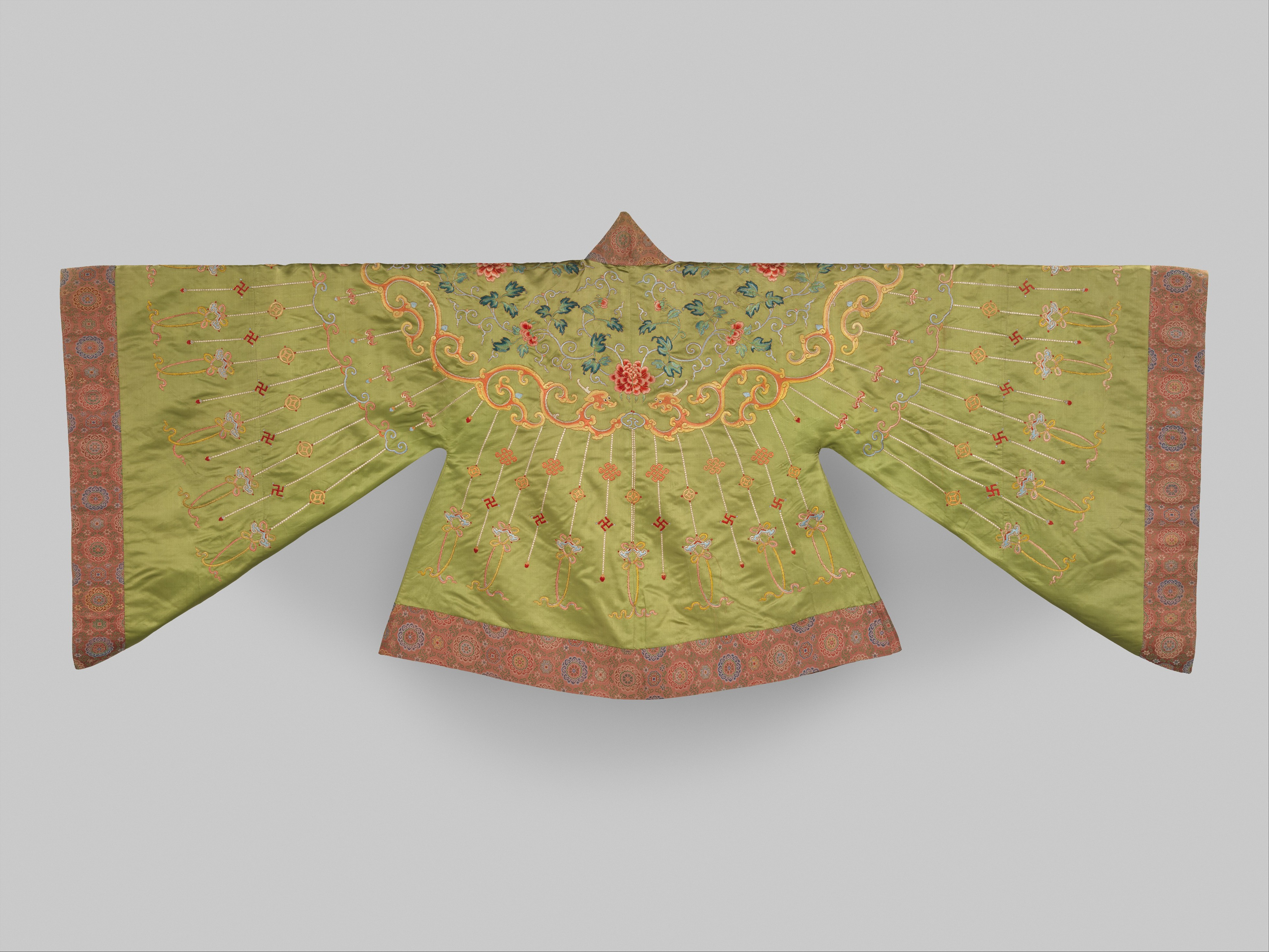
Chinese theatrical jacket decorated with a Chinese yingluo design, Qing dynasty, 18th century

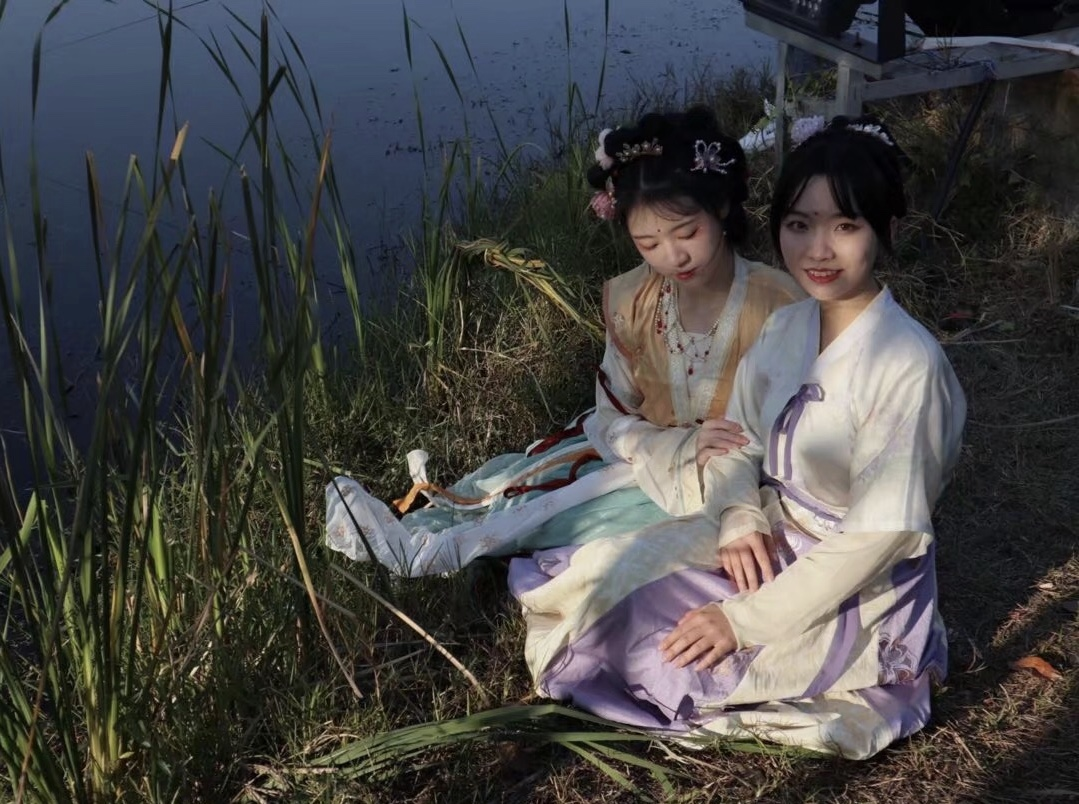
Girl wearing a pearl modern-style yingluo (left), 2021

== Origins in ancient India ==
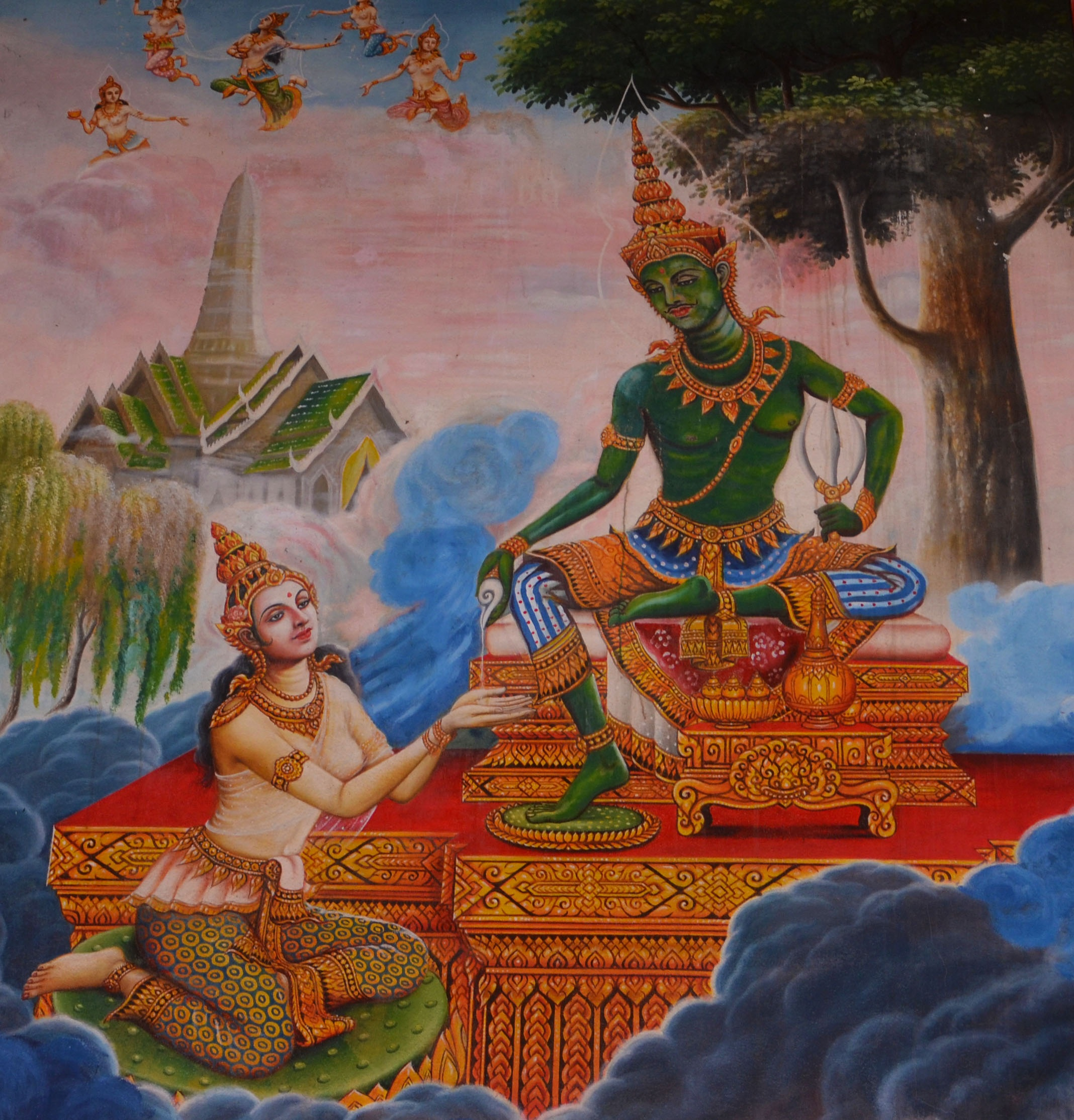
Thai illustration of Phusati with Śakra wearing Indian jeweled necklaces hāra (हार).

The prototype of the yingluo originated from ancient India where it was an Indian ornament known as keyūra, muktā-hāra, rucaka, hāra (हार) in Sanskrit, usually worn by the nobles of ancient India. The keyūra was not only used as a neck ornament. It was a body ornament which could be worn at the chest, arms, legs, and feet; it could also be worn as a crown or a head ornament, or as a bracelet which was made of gems and precious metals and knitted with string. Following the emergence of Buddhism, the keyūra became an ornament for Buddhist statues and Bodhisattva figures. When Buddhism was eventually introduced in China and in Japan, the keyūra was also introduced and became known as yingluo and Yōraku (瓔珞/よう‐らく, Yoraku) in China and Japan respectively.

== China ==
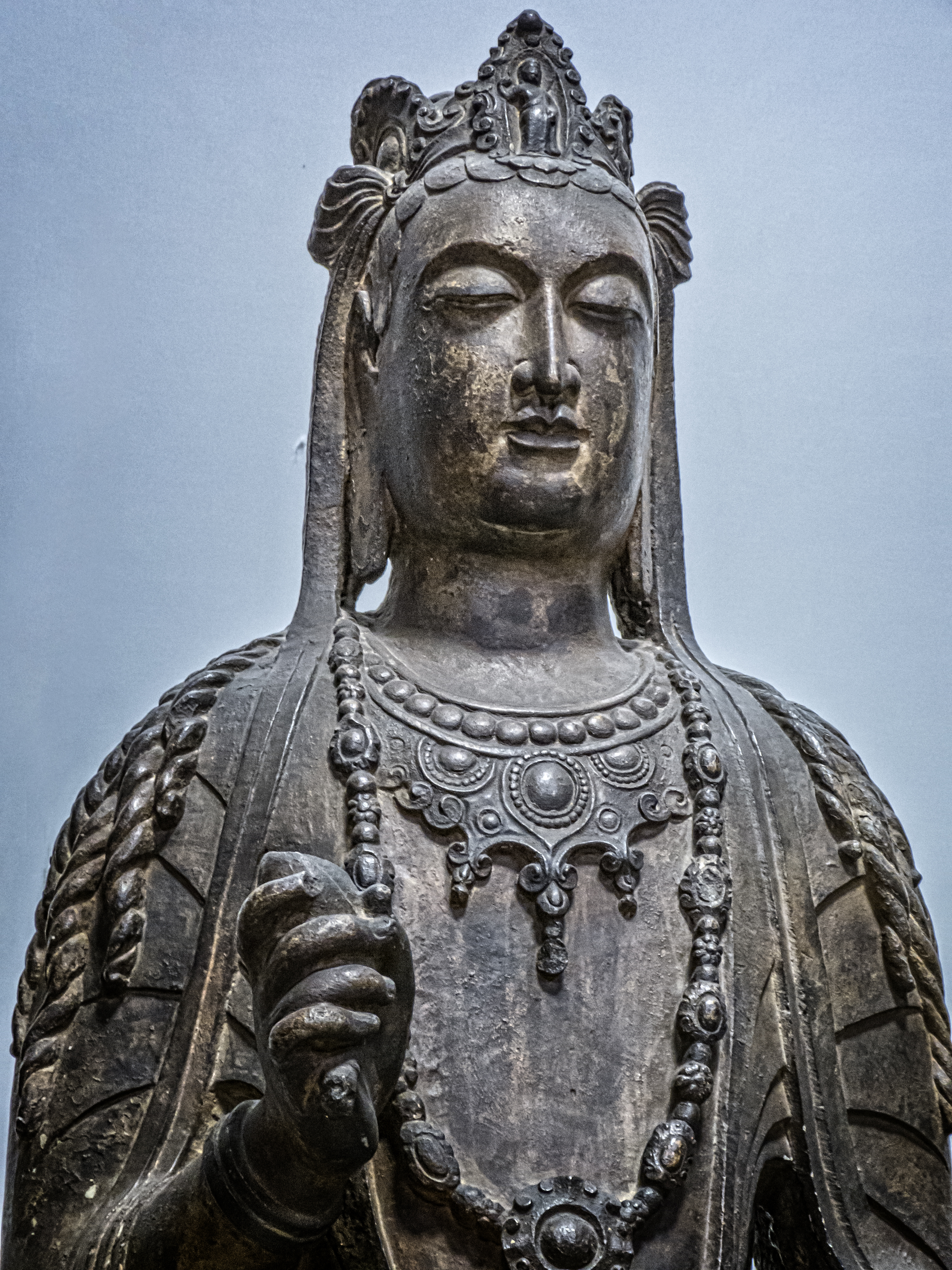
Yingluo (neck ornament) worn by a Bodhisattva, Northern Qi dynasty (550-577 CE), Hebei Province, China

In China, the yingluo became one of the most beautiful ornamental decoration used on Buddhist statues, murals, and frescoes, especially those found in the Dunhuang frescoes where the yingluo are depicted in variety of shapes and kinds. The yingluo depicted as decorative Buddhist art elements was often depicted on the bodies of Bodhisattva and was also one of its main decorative element. They were also concrete characteristics of the Dunhuang decorative arts which were constantly evolving and enriching itself. The design and style of the yingluo in the Dunhuang region shows the integration of foreign (non-Chinese) culture and the native Chinese culture due to the special characteristics of its geography. The Eastern Wei dynasty and the Northern Qi dynasty period, especially, was a period of cultural integration and cultural exchange which resulted in the yingluo becoming a relatively unique new fashion. For example, some bodhisattva figures in China dating from the second half of the 6th century AD wear extraordinary jewellery which already displayed Chinese stylistic art and innovations in iconography as well as influences from Non-Chinese culture, including Central Asian tradition in material culture. The early Tang dynasty yingluo in Buddhist arts inherited the appearance of the yingluo from the early Dunhuang period; however, its appearance, colour, art making as well as the material were more exquisite, rich and colourful, and was full with creativity. These decorative elements in the yingluo of this period also reflected the characteristics of the Tang dynasty-style Bodhisattva iconography which was eventually fully established and gradually became more mature.

The yingluo used as decorative elements in Buddhist arts was eventually imitated and transformed into an actual necklace by the Tang dynasty and was also adopted by the Khitan people of the Liao dynasty. The yingluo eventually became a classical neck jewellery in China while still remaining in use as a decorative ornaments in Chinese Buddhist iconography.

Chinese yingluo in Buddhist iconography

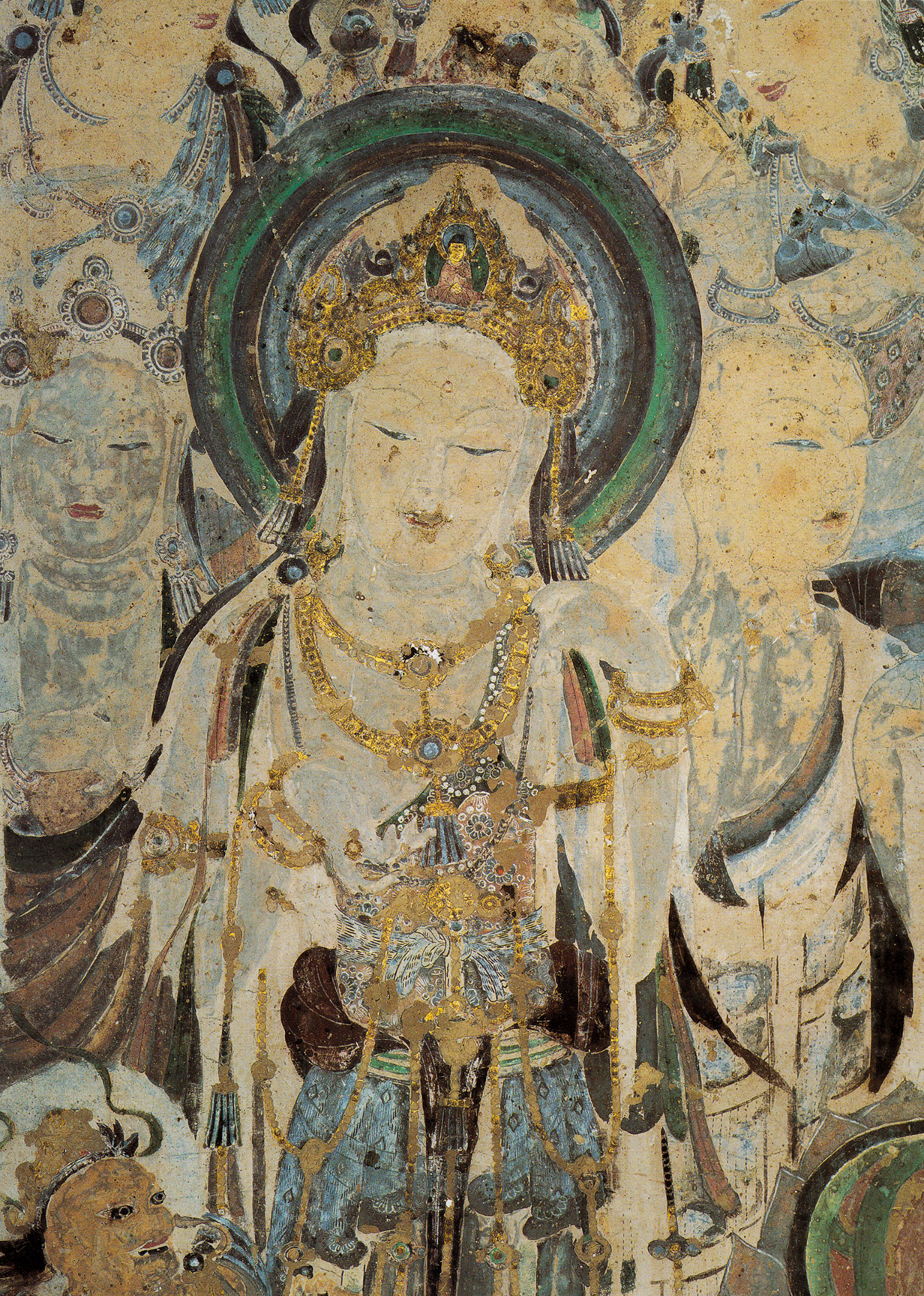
Mural of Avolokitesevara (Bodhisattva Guanyin), early Tang dynasty (618–907 AD)

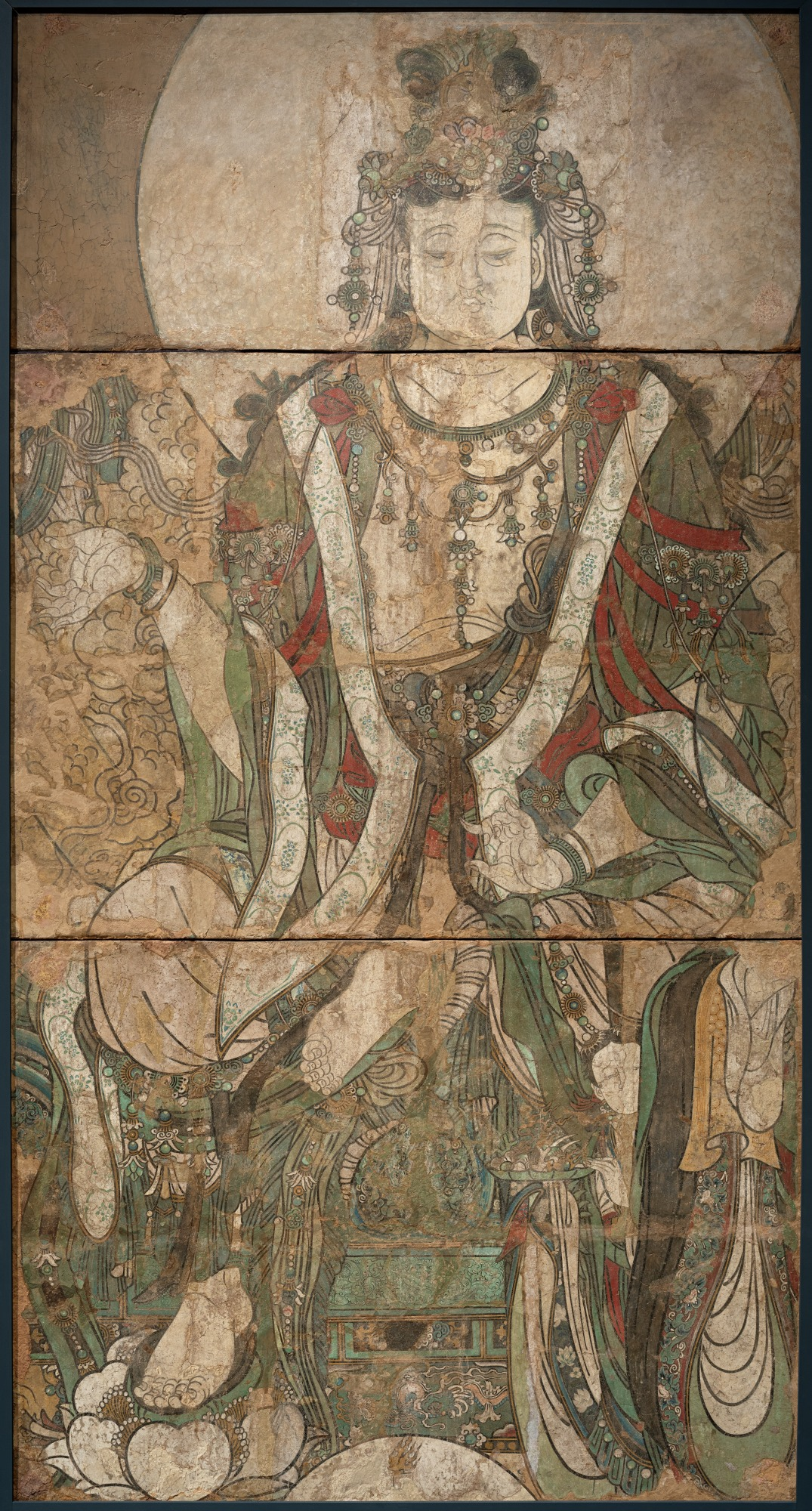
Bodhisattva, Ming dynasty, 1300

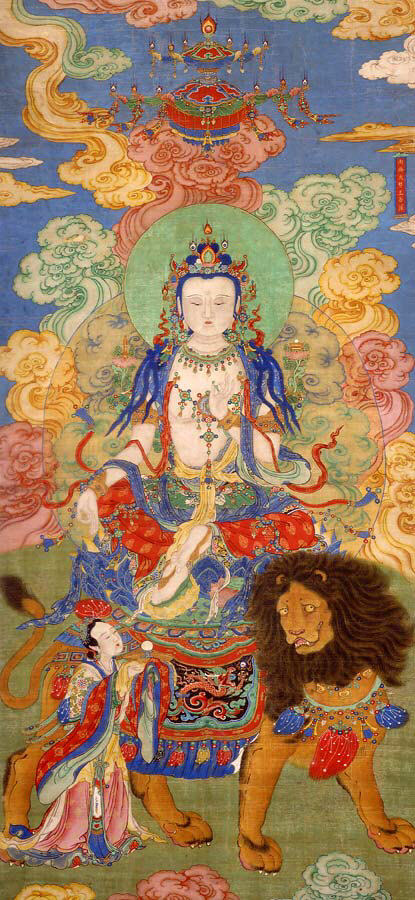
Manjusri Bodhisattva, Qing dynasty, late 17th–early 18th century

== Japan ==
In Japan, the keyūra was known as Yōraku (瓔珞/よう‐らく, Yoraku) where it was used as Buddhist art elements decorating Buddhist statues and shrines.

== See also ==
- Hanfu
- List of hanfu
- List of hanfu accessories
- Chaozhu (Court necklace)
- Lock charm
