= Hanfu accessories =

Fashion accessories worn in Hanfu

Hanfu accessories (Chinese: 汉服配饰; pinyin: hànfú pèishì; lit. 'hanfu accessories') refers to the various form of fashion accessories and self-adornments used and worn with hanfu throughout Chinese history. Hanfu consists of many forms of miscellaneous accessories, such as jewellery, yaopei (lit. 'waist ornaments'), ribbons, shawls, scarves, and hand-held accessories, etc.

== Jewellery ==
Chinese jewellery, including Chinese carved jade jewellery, often features Chinese symbols and iconography, and auspicious symbols and images, which are themselves rooted in Chinese culture, legends and mythologies, and philosophy. These symbols often reveal the Chinese traditions which have guided the Chinese civilization for thousands of years and which currently continue to remain in use in present-days.

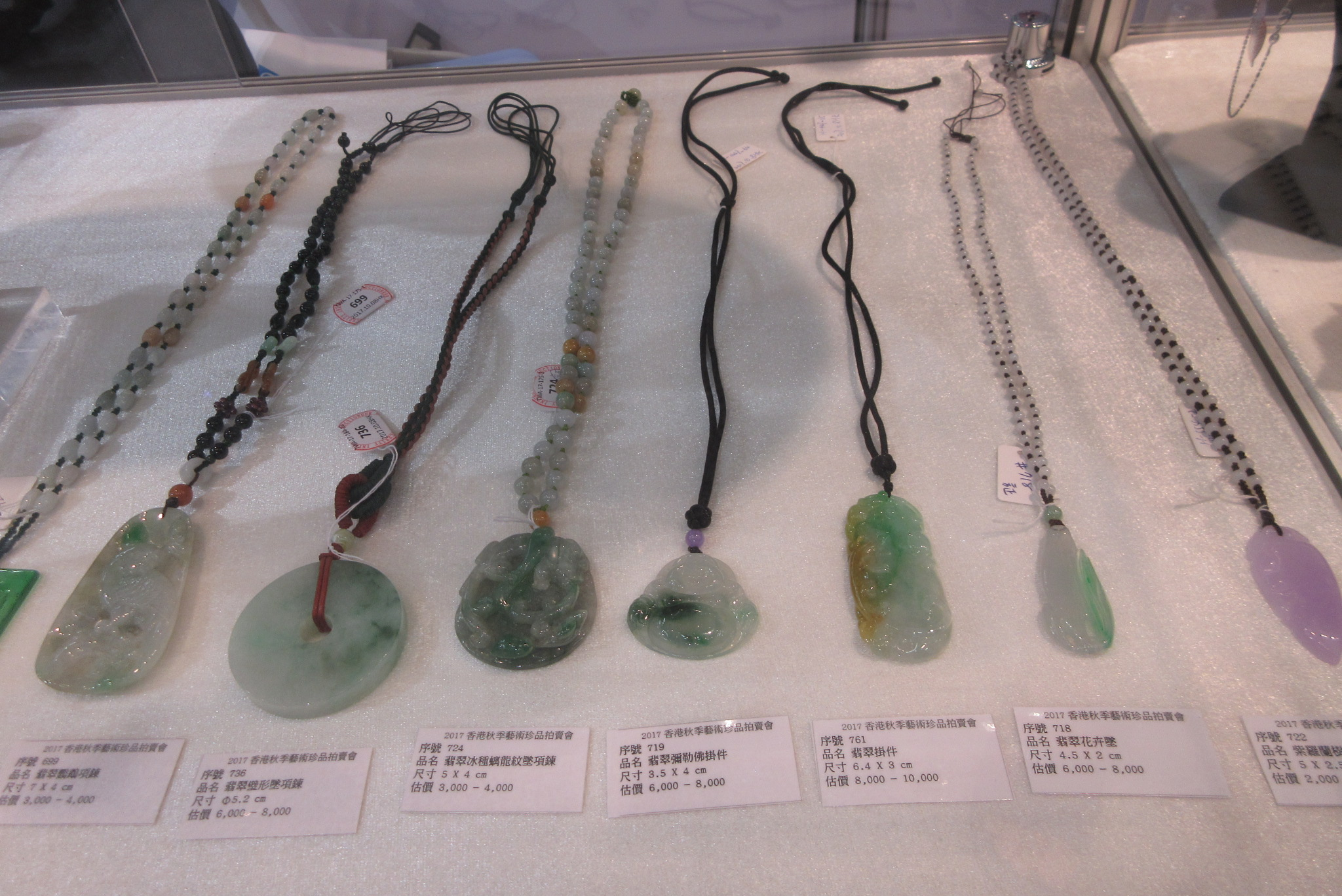
Necklaces with carved jade pendant

Jade culture is an important aspect of Chinese culture, reflecting both the material and spiritual culture of the Chinese people. Jade is deeply ingrained in Chinese culture and played a role in every aspect of social life; it is also associated with positive qualities and aspects such as purity, excellence, and harmony. Jade is even more valued than gold in Chinese culture. Traditionally, jade jewellery especially often expressed positive sentiments and good wishes; and, jade itself were often gifted on important and/or special occasions such as wedding and childbirth.

Silver was another common material in the making of Chinese ornaments and ritual items since ancient times; it also holds an irreplaceable place in Chinese culture and plays a significant role in being a carrier of Chinese traditional culture and in preserving ancient Chinese cultural heritage. Moreover, according to Chinese belief, silver could be used to avoid evil spirits and thus wearing silver ornaments and jewelries was believed to bring good luck to its wearer.

Other materials used in traditional Chinese jewellery making were: jinzi, gold, shanhu (lit. 'coral'), zhenzhu (Chinese: 真珠; lit. 'pearl'), lüsongshi (lit. 'turquoise'), chensha (lit. 'cinnabar'), niugu (lit. 'ox bone'). Niugu was used as an alternative to a rare material known as xiangya (lit. 'ivory'). Zuanshi (lit. 'diamond'), on the other hand, was typically not used in traditional Chinese jewellery as it considered too bright and vulgar; and thus, it was generally avoided.

=== Bracelets ===
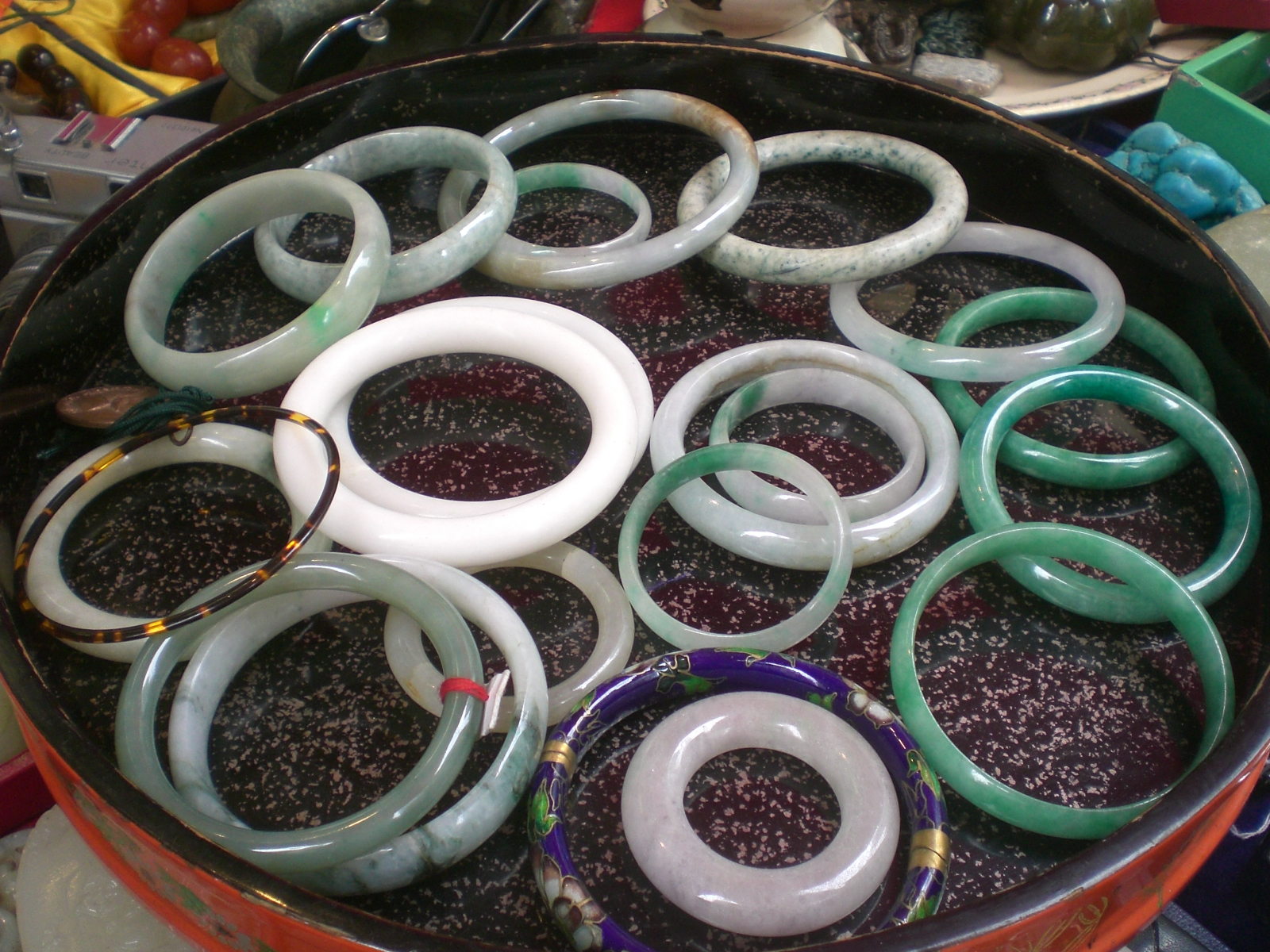
Jade bracelets, Hong Kong, 2009

Jade bracelets have been favoured by Chinese women since ancient times regardless of social ranking and has been one of the most important form of jewellery in Chinese culture. According to ancient Chinese beliefs, jade bracelets should be worn on the left hand as it is closest to the heart. Chinese women typically had at least three jade bracelets throughout her lifetime: the first one was given by her father as a little girl, the second is given to the girl by her mother when she gets married and which will be passed from generation to generation as a family heirloom, and the third one (regardless of the price and the quality) is given to the girl by her lover to express his love and his desire to protect her for a lifetime, which led to the saying, "no bracelet can't get married". Another jade bracelet may be given by a mother-in-law to her new daughter-in-law when she gets married. There is a belief in China which says that if a jade bracelet breaks, the death of its wearer has been supplanted by the broken bracelet. Jade bracelets continue to be prized and worn nowadays. It is also currently used as a form of fashion accessory used by hanfu enthusiasts.

=== Earrings ===
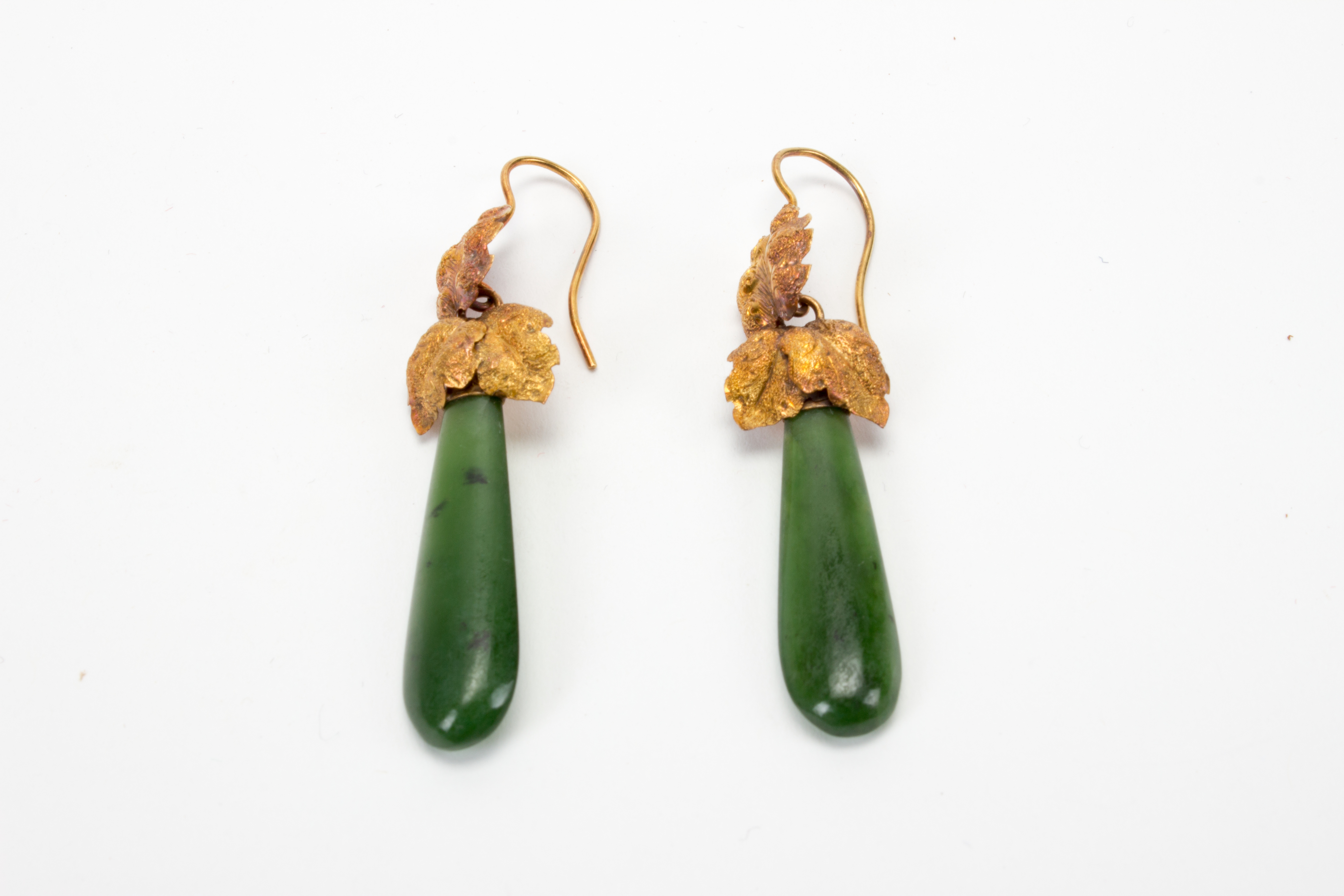
A pair of jade earring, Qing dynasty

Earrings in China originated in the Neolithic period; however, they were first used as decorations or amulets. A form of popular earring which pierced the earlobe was the er dang (Chinese: 耳珰) which became popular during the Warring States Period and the Qin dynasty. Ancient er dang were made out gold, jade, silver, ivory, marble, glass and crystal. Glass er dang became popular from the Han dynasty to the Southern and Northern dynasties due to its bright colours and due to its glittering characteristics and translucence.

In the Zhou dynasty, when in the form of jade pendants, the earrings could also be used as decorations to be hanged on guan, a form of Chinese headgear; they were especially used on the mianguan of the Emperor where they became known as chong er (lit. 'ear plugs'). When used on headgear, the chong er were a representation of self-discipline and introspection, both of which were important required characteristics in Chinese culture; the purpose of these jade pendants decorations thus reminded its wearer that he should avoid hearing and listening to anything without careful consideration and avoid slander while simultaneously remind the wearer that he should show humility and listen to good suggestions. These jade pendants gradually spread from the Emperor to officials and scholars, to women who would then hang it to their Chinese hairpins. The er dang attached to hairpins were used by empresses, imperial concubines and princesses during the Han dynasty allowing the er dang to hung down beside their two ears.

Based on archaeological findings, it appears that it was a popular trend for ancient women to only wear a single er dang (especially on the left ear) instead of pairs of earrings. During the Song dynasty that women started to piece their two ears and wore er dang; these earrings could be made with gold and pearls. Wearing earrings among Chinese women then became popular in the Ming and Qing dynasties.

In the Ming dynasty, the practice of wearing a single earring on the ear was not customary for Chinese men, and such practices were typically associated with the non-Chinese people living along the northern and north-western borders; however, there is an exception: young Chinese boys would wear a single ring-shaped earring attached to their ear as an amulet to protect them against evil spirits.

In Qing dynasty, Han Chinese women wore a single earring at each ears which contrasted from the Manchu women who had to wear three earrings at each ear. From the middle of the eighteenth century, Manchu women adopted the Han Chinese single earring despite breaking the Manchu dress code and the laws which prevented them from wearing Han Chinese women clothing; this frustrated the Qing emperors.

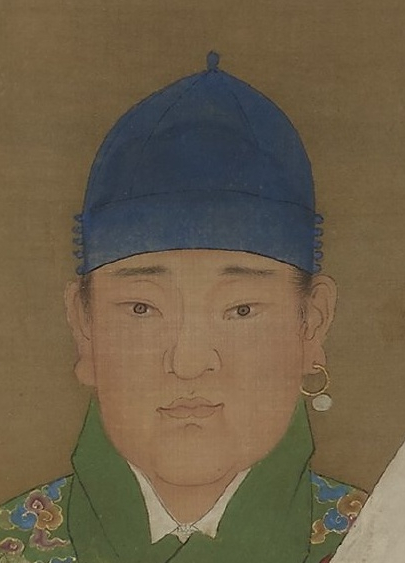
A young Chinese boy wearing single ring-shaped earring on the left ear, Ming dynasty

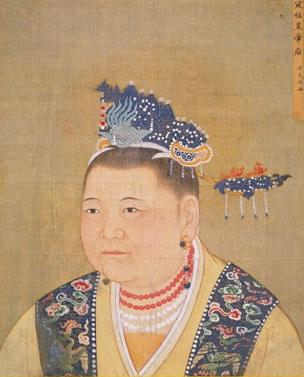
Song dynasty empress wearing single gold earring at each ear.

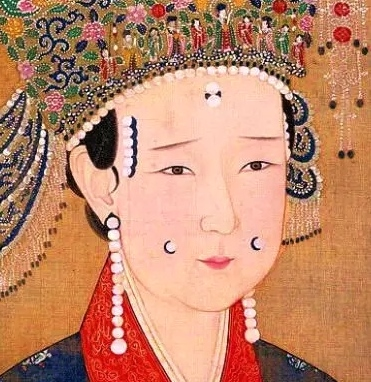
Pearl pendant earring, Song dynasty

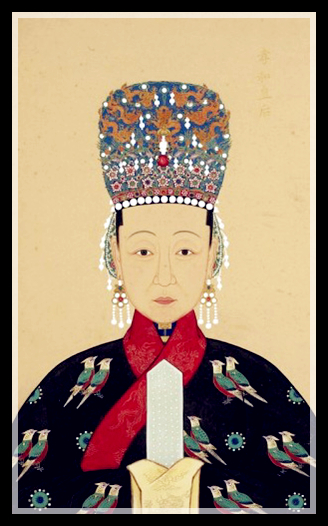
Empress of Ming wearing a dangling earring at each ear.

=== Rings ===
Rings were initially used as decorations and finger protection when drawing bows since the Neolithic period. They were then given to the Empresses and imperial concubines in the Emperor's concubines to express or indicate their current physical conditions by the Emperor; by the time of Qin and Han dynasties, a gold ring worn on the left hand were used to express being on menstruation or being pregnant and thus that its wearer were unsuitable to serve the Emperor while a silver ring on the left hand expressed that its wearer was available to serve the Emperor; following a night with the Emperor, the silver ring would be moved from left to the right hand. This custom was then gradually spread to the nobles and officials before spreading to the civilians.

Rings which were mostly made of precious materials, such as jade, gold, and silver, were also bestowed presents to accomplished court officials and they were used as love token by couples. Rings later became one of the most important betrothal gift for a bride since the Southern Song dynasty.

=== Necklaces ===
Yingluo

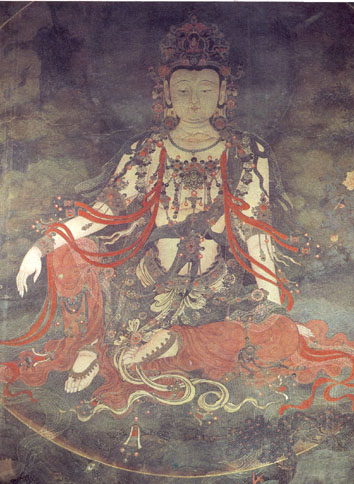
Depiction of Bodhisattva Guanyin wearing yingluo around the neck

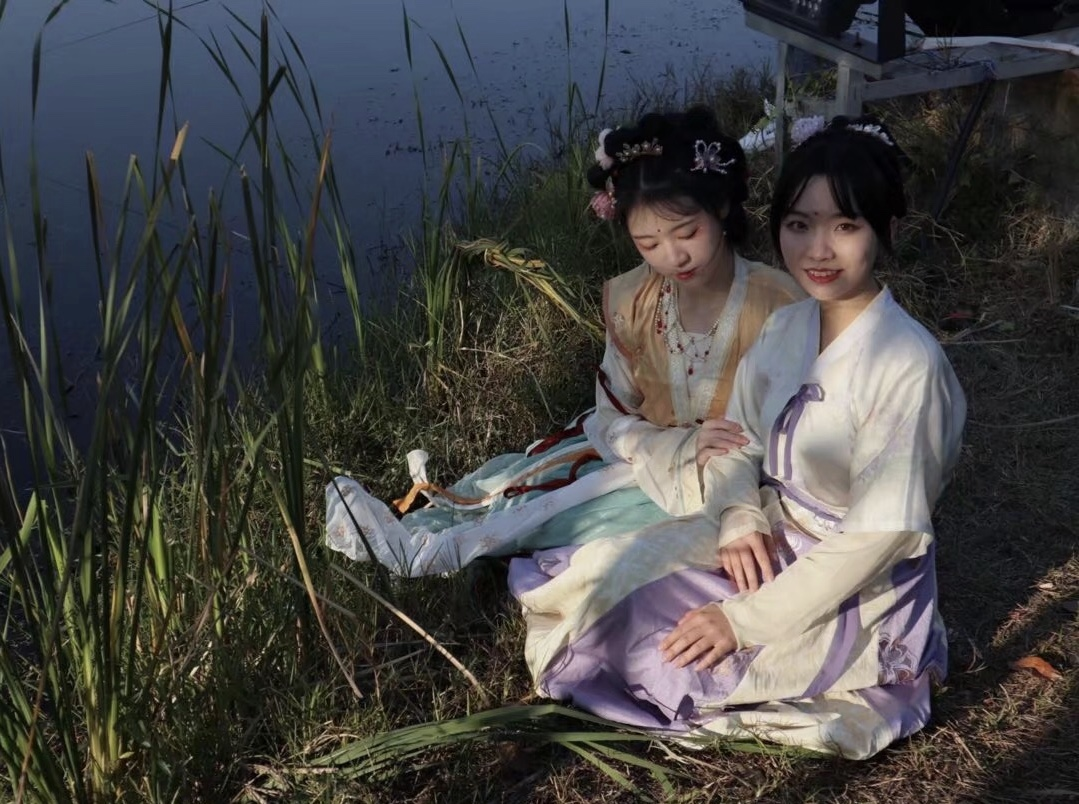
Girl wearing a hanfu and a modern-style, pearl yingluo (left), 2021

Yingluo (Chinese: 璎珞) is currently a common necklace accessory used by hanfu enthusiasts. It is a ring-shaped ornament developed in ancient China, which is hung on the neck and chest, worn on the head, arms and legs. It is mainly made of pearls, precious stones and precious metals. At first, it was used as a Buddhist ornament, but later it was widely adopted as a necklace and headwear in Chinese women's clothing.

There is also a custom of wearing a necklace with a longevity lock pendant, changmingsuo (lit. 'longevity lock'). These lock charms were sometimes personally tied around the necks of children by Buddhist or Taoist priests.

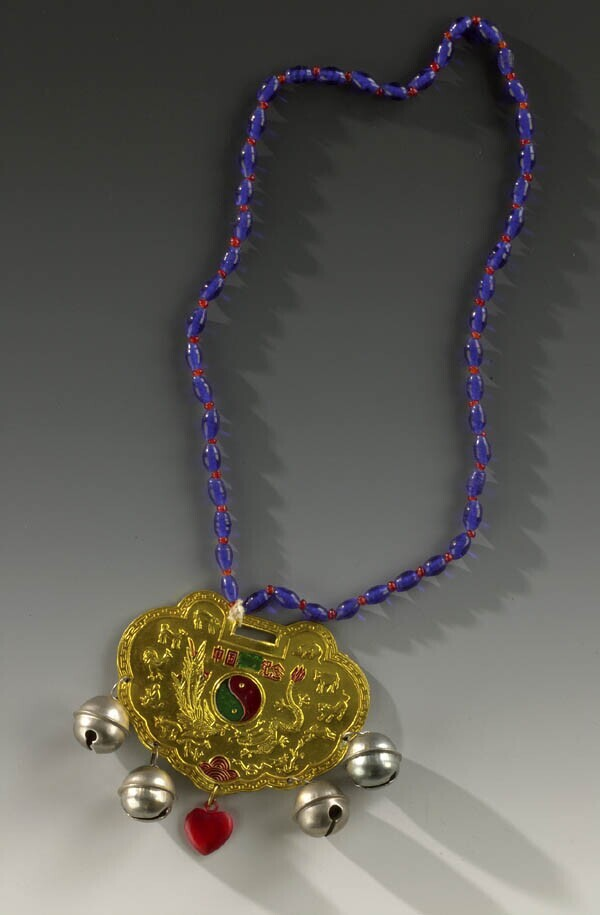
Chinese necklace with longevity lock.

=== Pendants and charms ===
==== Longevity locks ====
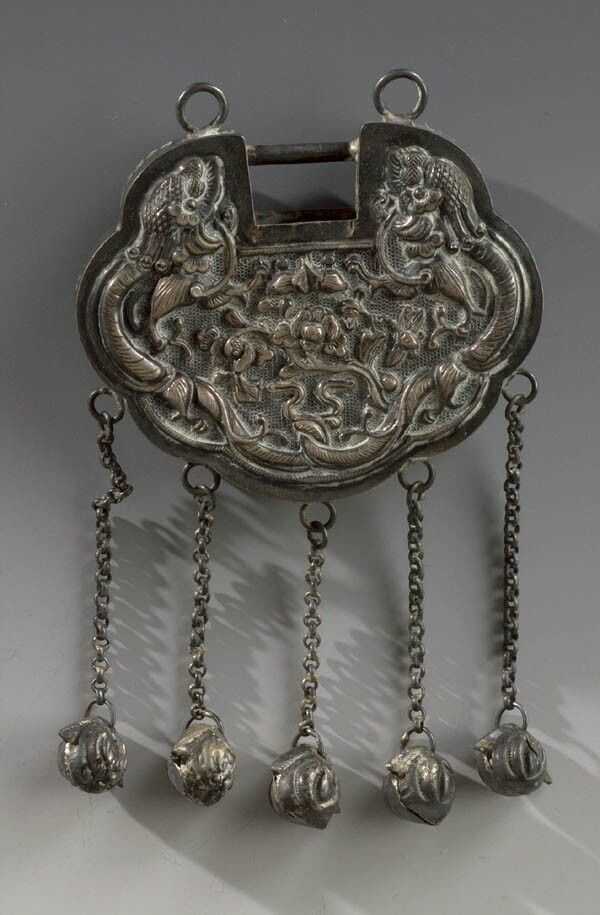
A silver changmingsuo (lock charm)

The longevity lock is known as changmingsuo (lit. 'longevity lock') has an important form of amulet for children for thousand of years in Chinese culture; according to Chinese beliefs, the changmingsuo protect children from evil spirits and bad luck by locking its wearer's soul and life inside of the lock. The changmingsuo is often made with precious materials, such as gold, silver (which is also believed to ward off evil and bring good luck), and jade, and having auspicious words carved on it. The changmingsuo is also a manifestation of the blessing from the older generation who hoped that the child would live a long time (longevity) and remove illness (health). Both blessings of longevity and health form part of the concept of wufu (Chinese: 五福; lit. 'Five fortune'), which are considered to be five important life goals according to traditional Chinese philosophy and beliefs and which hold an important place in every aspect of Chinese culture and life.

==== Jade pendants ====
Yupei (Chinese: 玉佩) and had a rigid and specific rules attached to its use. Some jade pendants also combined jades in the shape of dragons, phoenixes, humans, human-dragons, and animals, etc. In the Qing dynasty, it was popular for women to wear green, translucent jade jewelries; pendants which were carved in the shape of a curving dragon was popular.

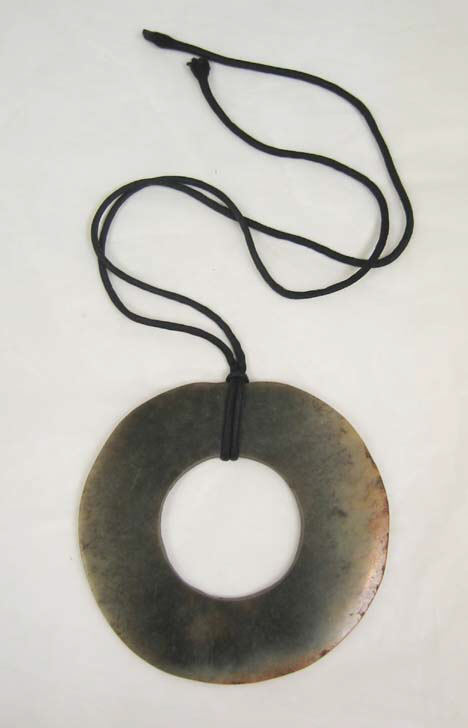
Chinese Jade pendant in the form of a bi, 2000–1500 B.C.

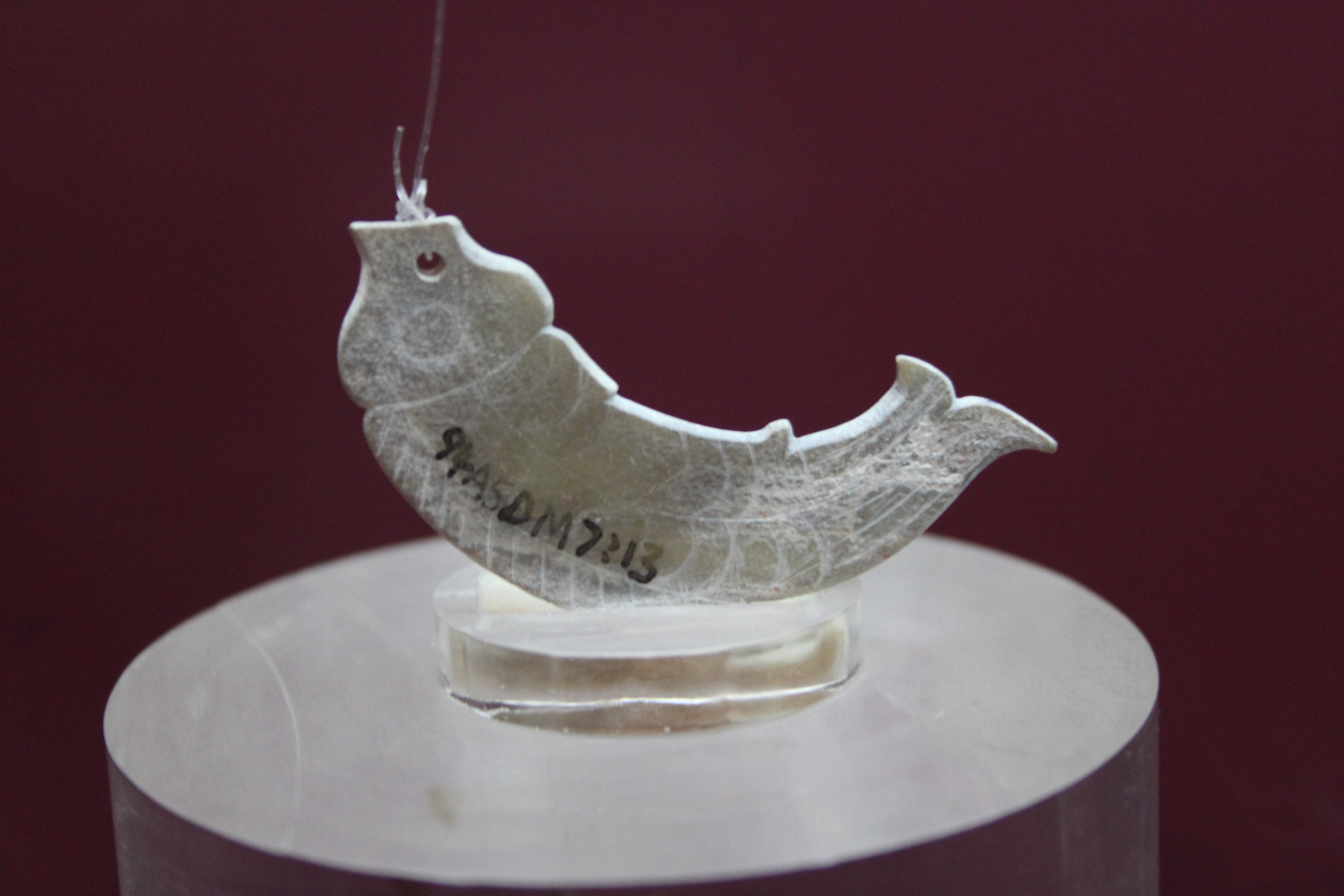
Shang jade pendant in the form of a fish

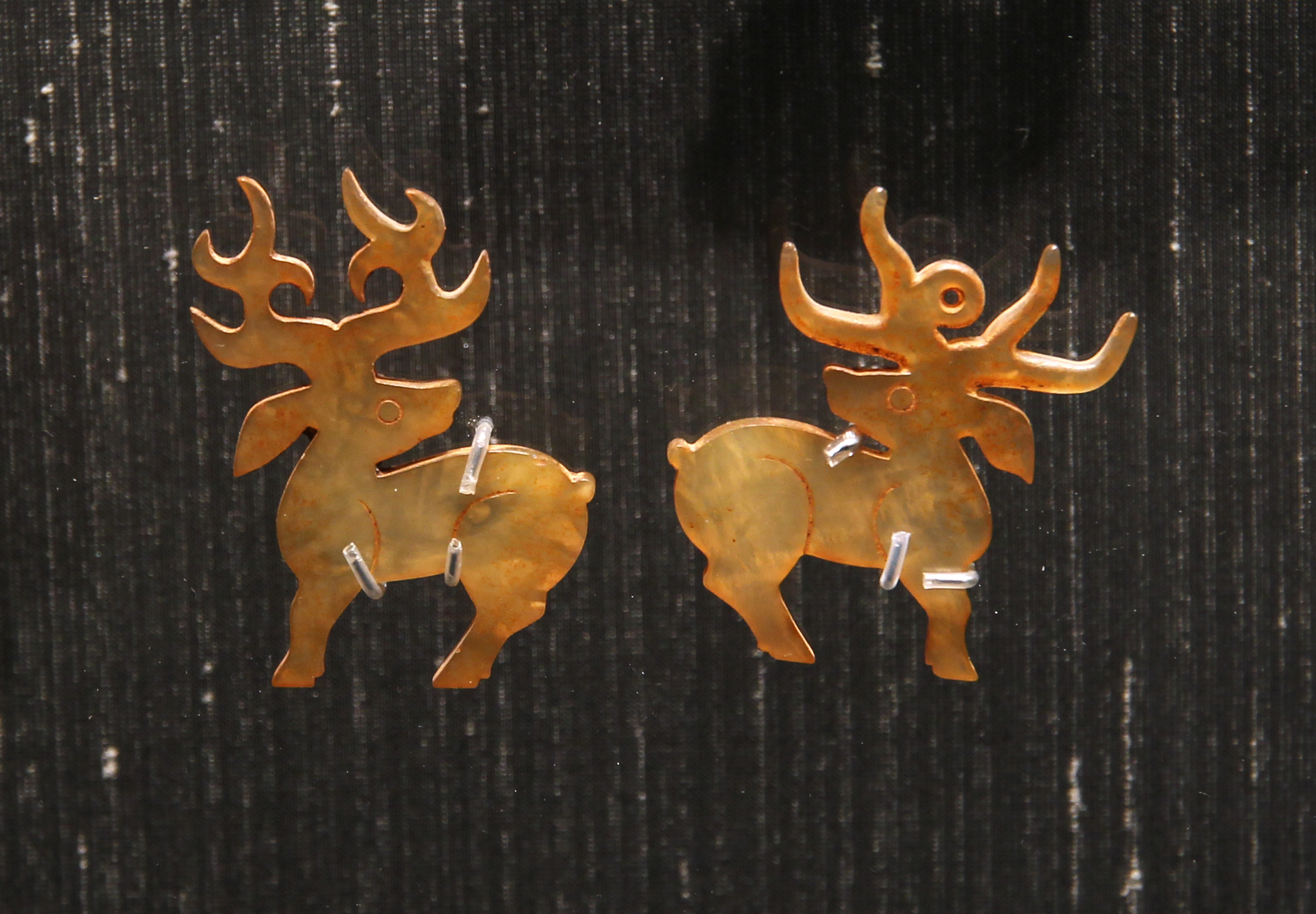
Jade pendants in the form of stags, Western Zhou.

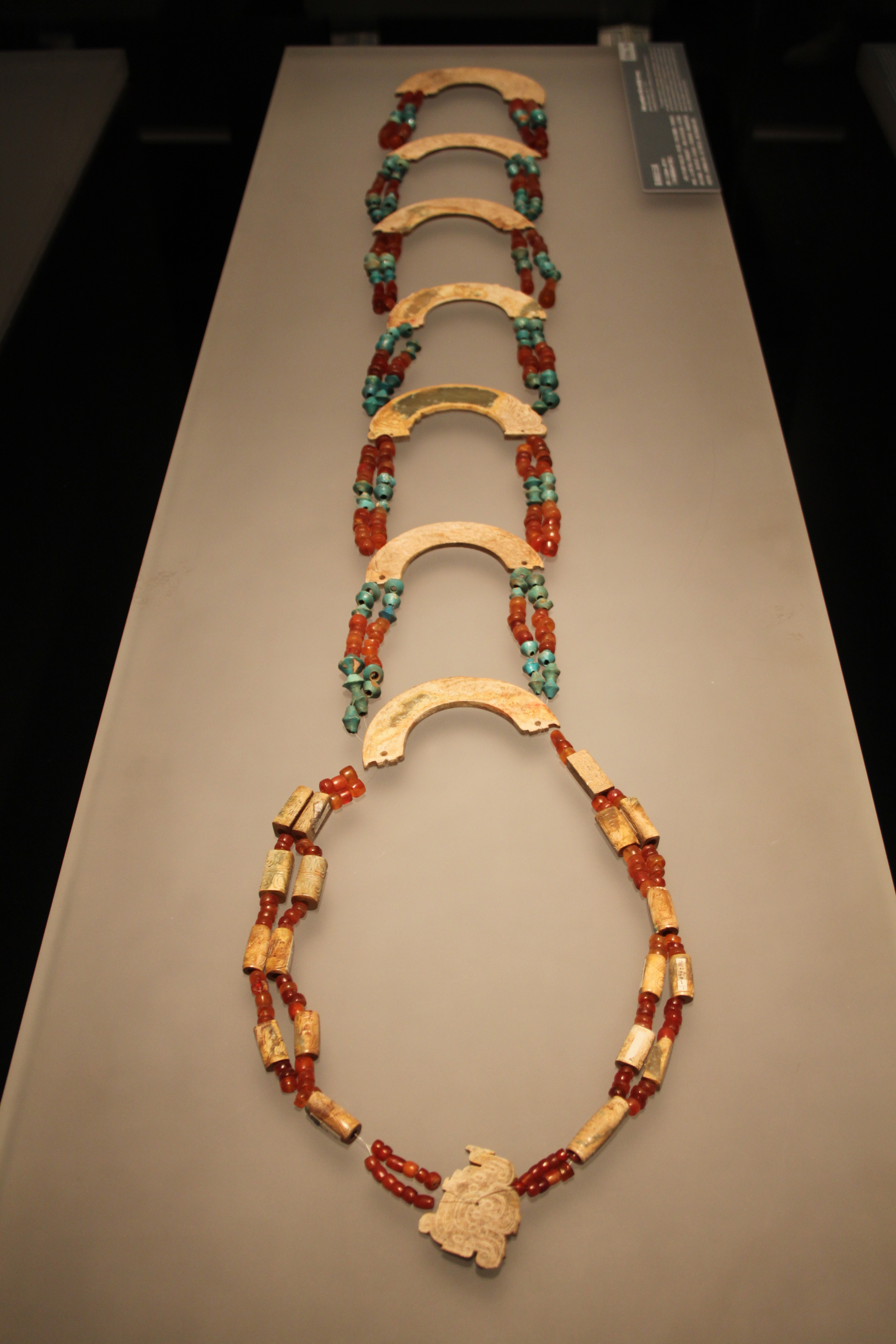
Jade pendant with Huang, Western Zhou

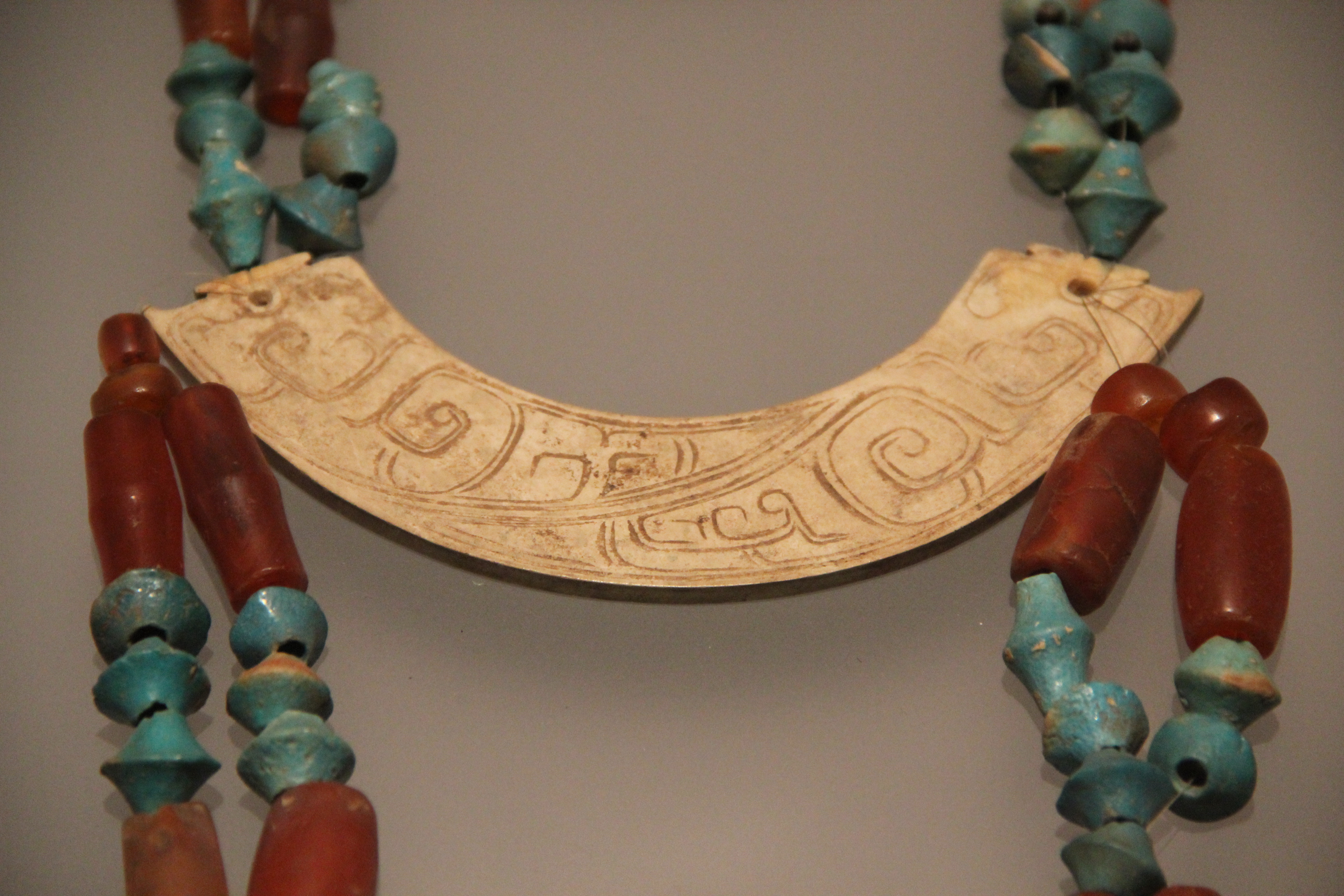
Western Zhou Jade Huang from a jade pendant.

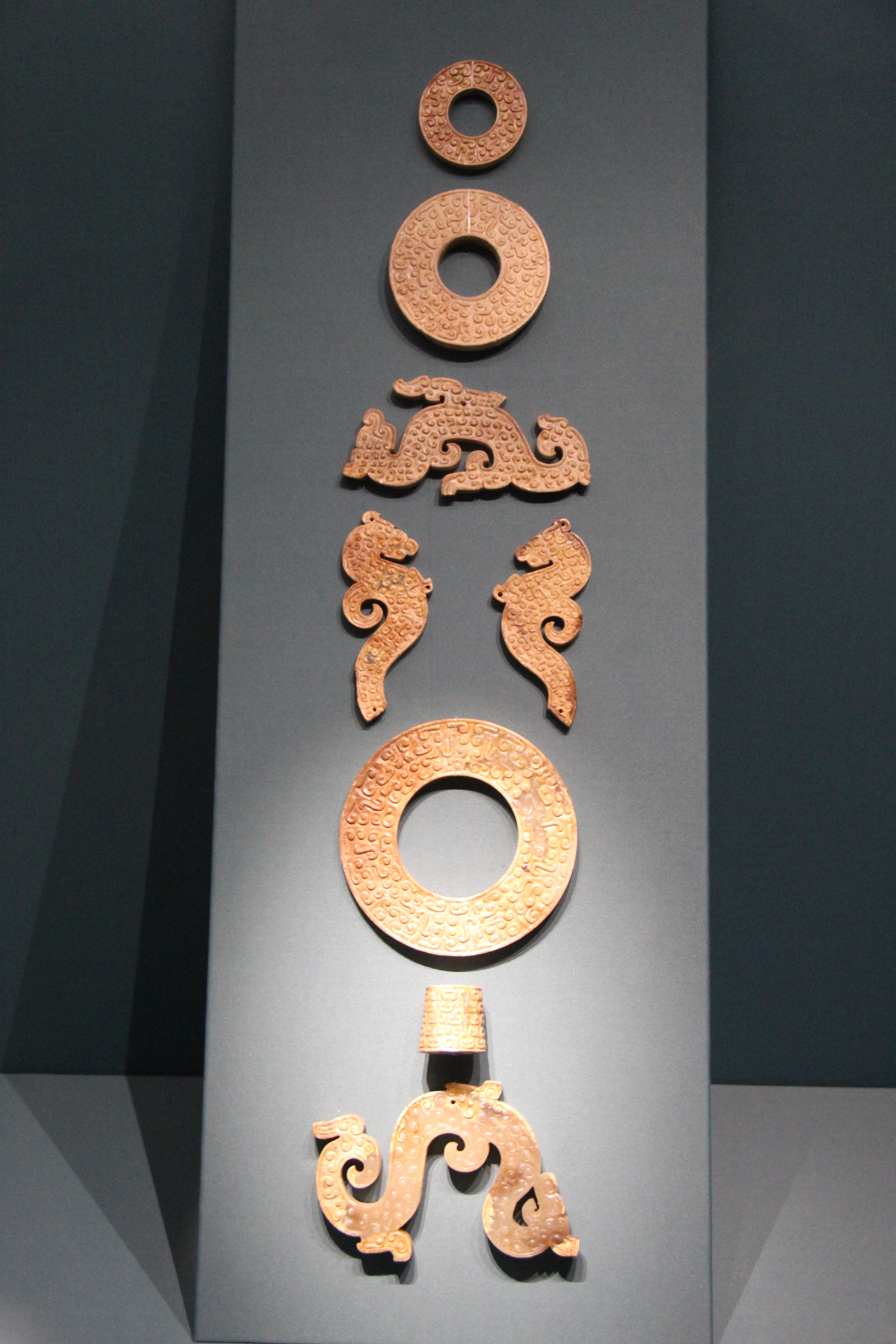
Late Spring & Autumn Jade Ornaments composed of bi and huang jade, and dragon-shaped jade.

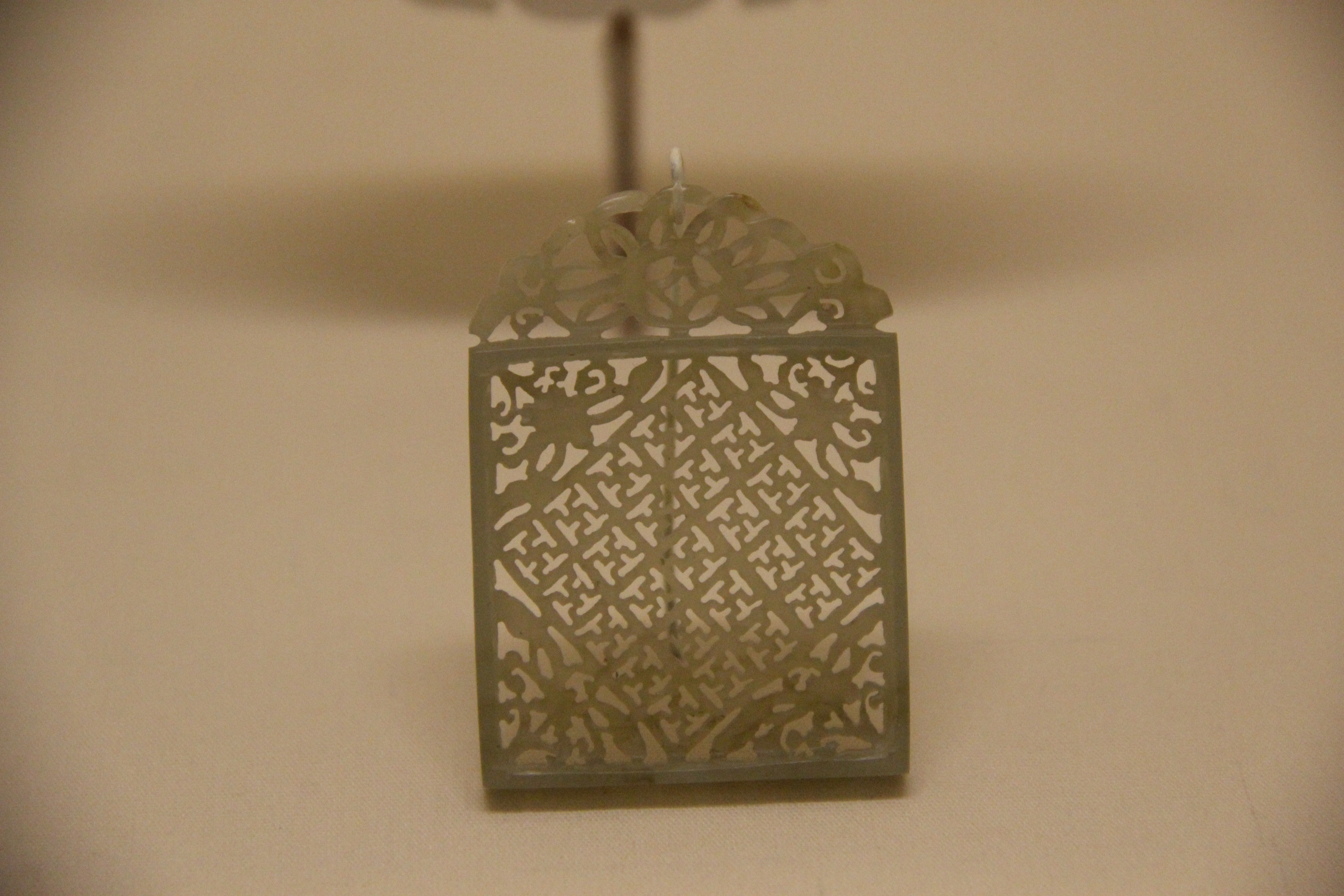
Ming Jade pendant

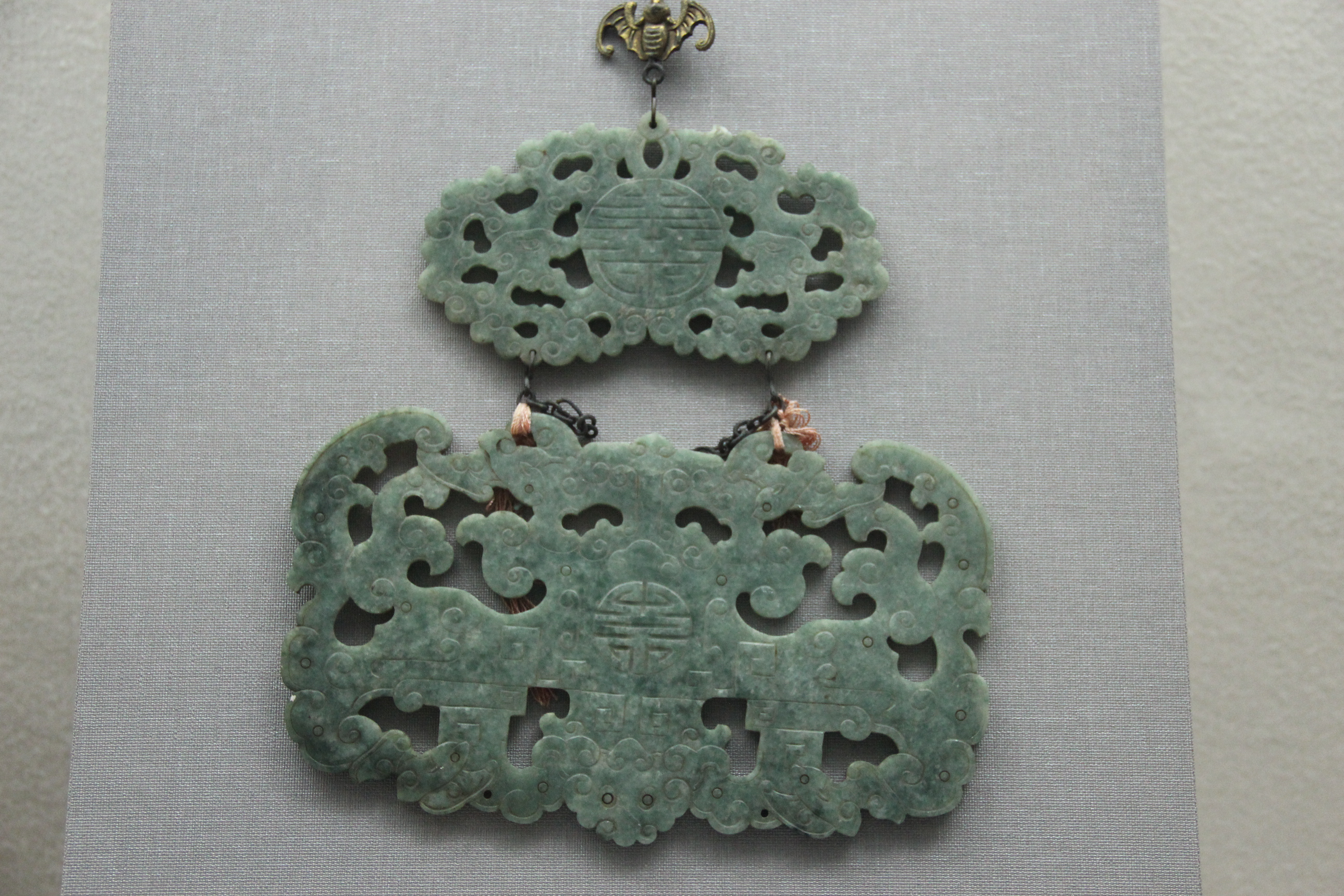
Jade pendant, Qing dynasty

===== Jinbu =====
Jinbu

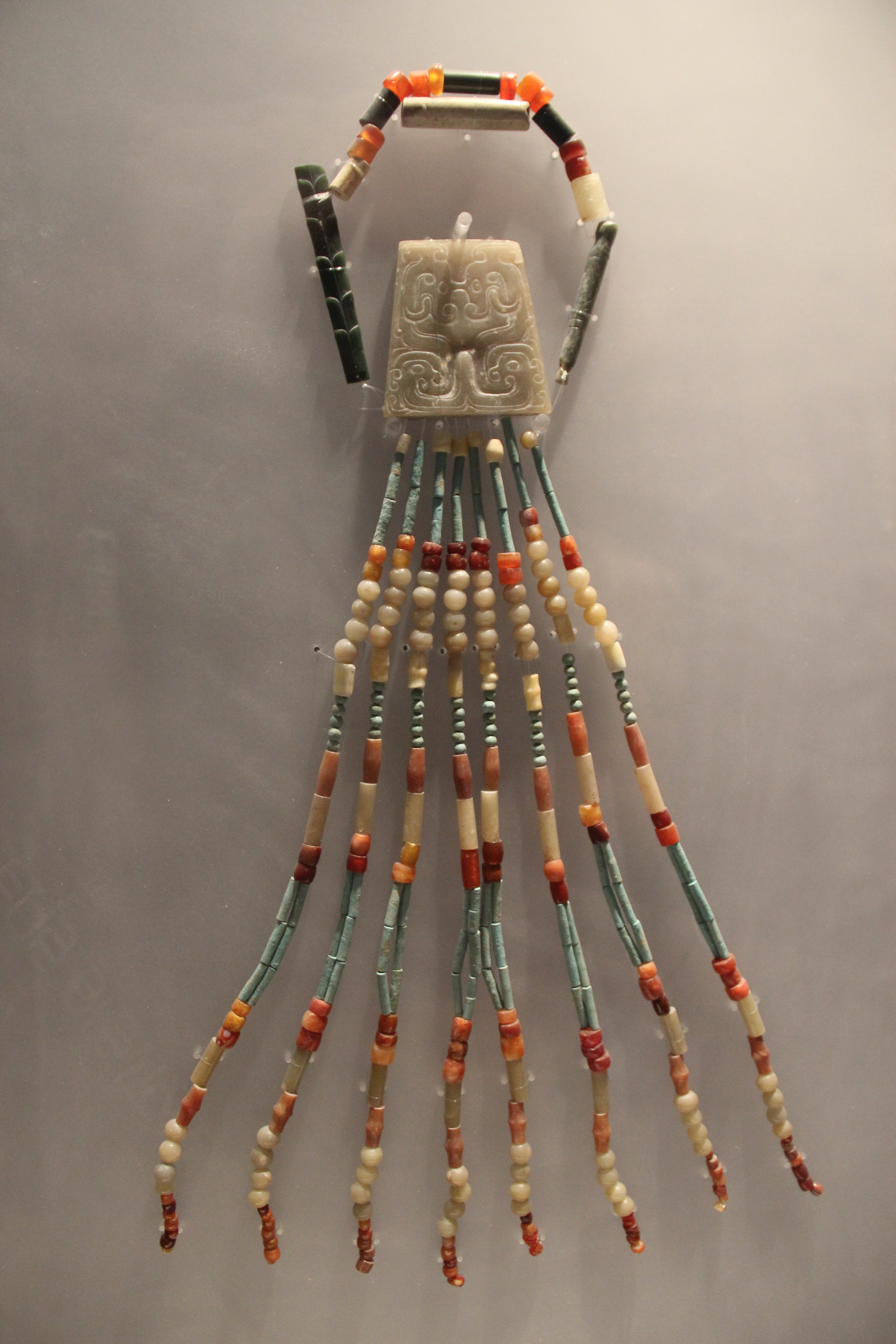
Jinbu is made of an ensemble of yupei (jade pendants) and other precious materials, unearthed from Ying state, Western Zhou

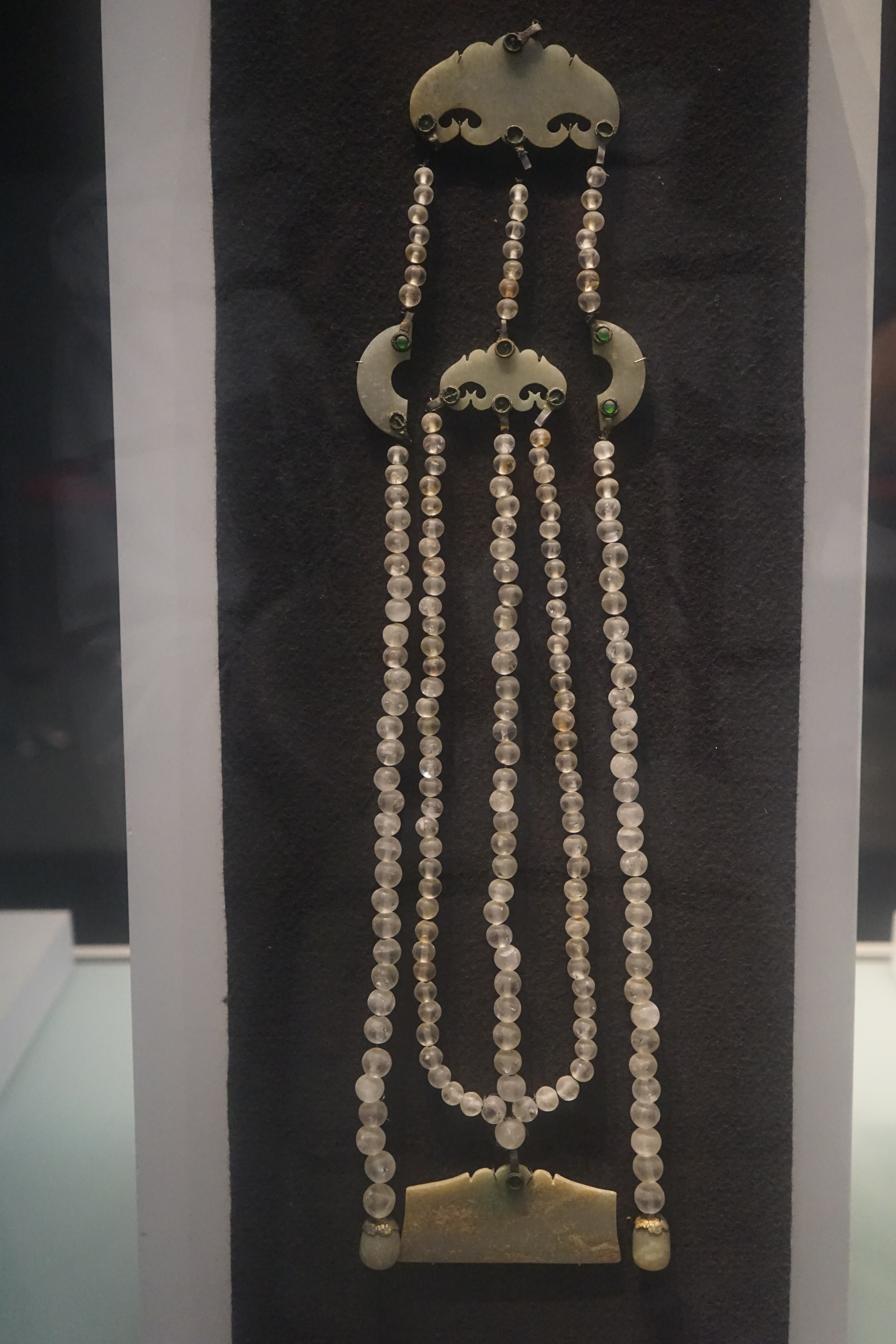
Unearthed jinbu dating from the Tang dynasty

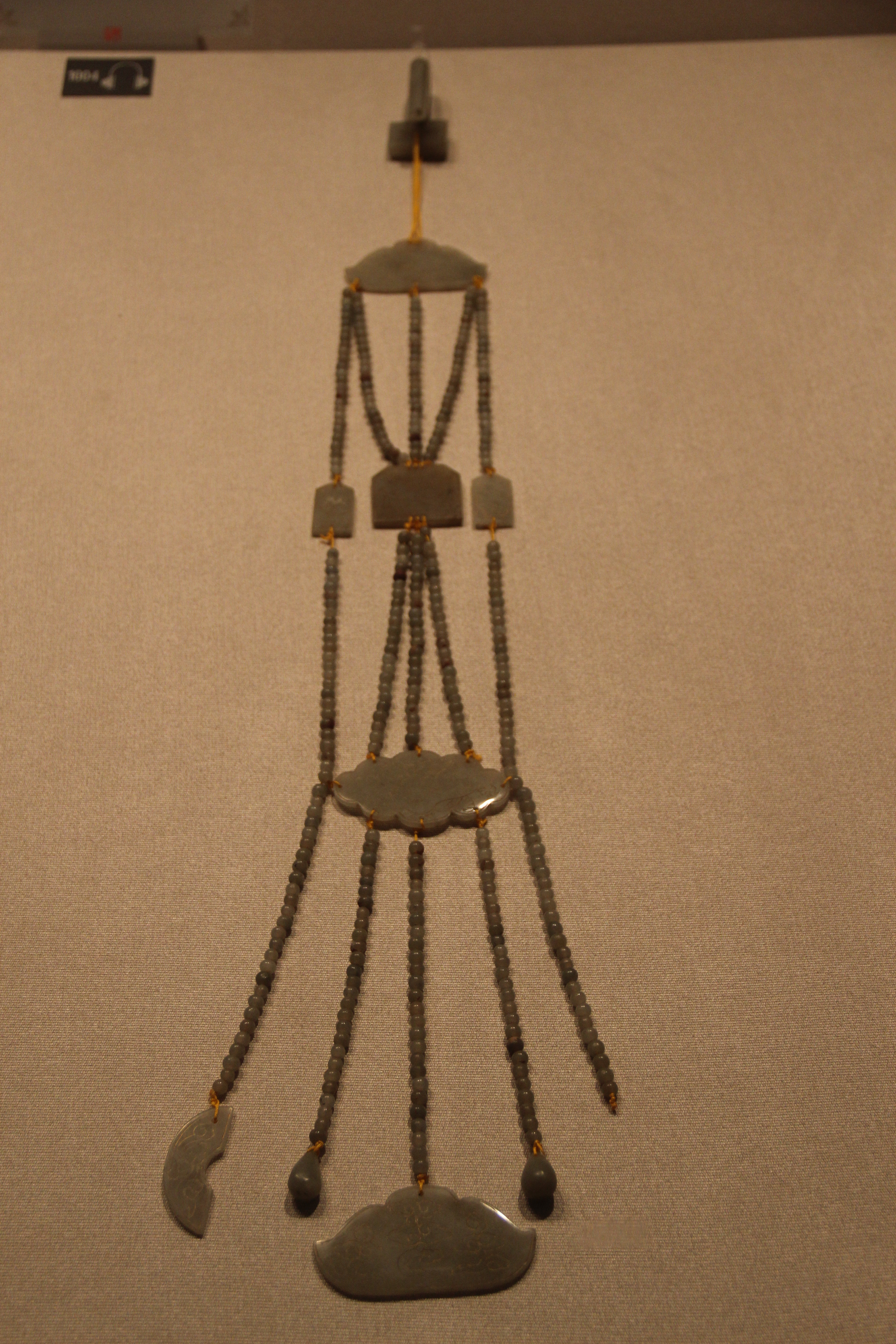
Jinbu unearthed from the tomb of Prince Zhu Tan, Ming dynasty

Ensemble of jade pendants and/or jade strings which were combined with other precious materials (such as silver or gold accessories) were called jinbu (Chinese: 禁步); the jinbu were a type of yaopei (waist accessories) which were typically worn by women to press down the hemline of their clothing. The jinbu appeared thousands of years ago and were initially only worn by nobles, but with time, it was gradually adopted by all women regardless of their social ranks. The jinbu also used to be an indicator of elegance and etiquette in ancient times: if the behaviour of its wearer is discourteous (i.e. walking too fast), the jinbu would sound loud, and thus, it would remind the wearer to mind his manners and elegance; on the other hand, if its wearer behave appropriately, the jinbu would sound melodic and pleasant. This is also explained in the chapter Yuzao《玉藻》in the Liji:

When (the king or ruler) was walking quickly (to the court of audience), he did so to the music of the Cai Qi; when walking more quickly (back to the reception-hall), they played the Si Xia. When turning round, he made a complete circle; when turning in another direction, he did so at a right angle. When advancing, he inclined forward a little; he held himself up straight; and in all these movements, the pieces of jade emitted their tinklings. So also the man of rank, when in his carriage, heard the harmonious sounds of its bells; and, when walking, those of his pendant jade-stones; and in this way evil and depraved thoughts found no entrance into his mind.

— Translated by James Legge, Liji 《玉藻 - Yu Zao》, 37

It is currently used as a form of fashion accessory used by hanfu enthusiasts.

=== Press lapels ===
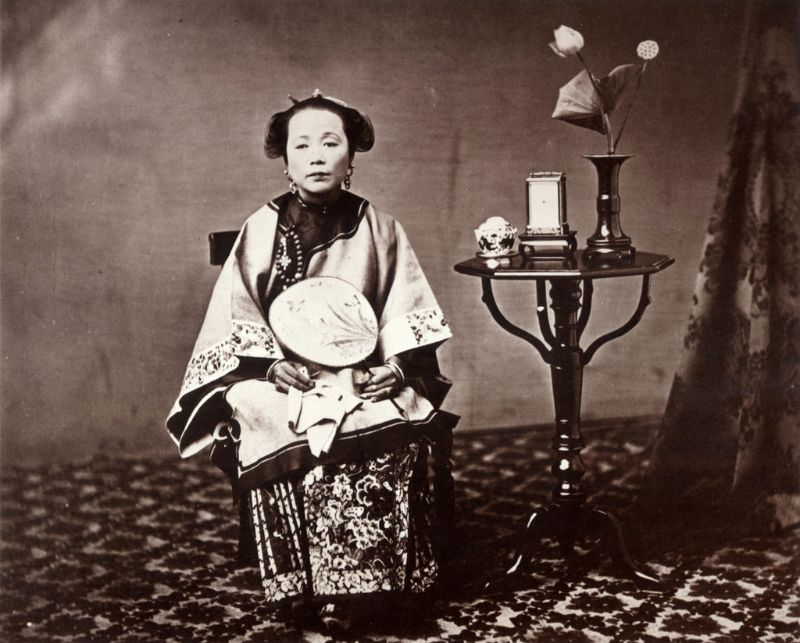
A lady wearing shibazi-style yajin to press down the lapel of her ao, 1861–1864

Yajin (Chinese: 压襟; pinyin: yājīn) are used as press lapels on upper garment ornaments; it could include pendants, hebao, and fragrant sachet, and shibazi.

In Qing dynasty, Han Chinese women wore pendant-like charms as yajin; these pendant-like charms were made of diverse materials (such as jade, amber, gold) and were placed at the top button on the side of their ao-jacket. They also wore other forms of pendants, such as pendants made of metal filigree in the shape of potpourri container which would be filled with fragrant herbs and long silver pendants with small silver charms which were filled with bells which would frightened evil spirits away when they tickled as they wore. They would also hang hebao (purses) on the top button of their jacket.

A style of yajin was the shibazi-style. A shibazi is a type of 18-beads bracelet which originated from the japamala. The shibazi sometimes have hanging buckles; they would be hung on the right lapels of upper clothing or could be worn around the wrist like a regular bracelet. There were no strict regulations on its wearing etiquette.

== Belts, girdles, and sashes ==
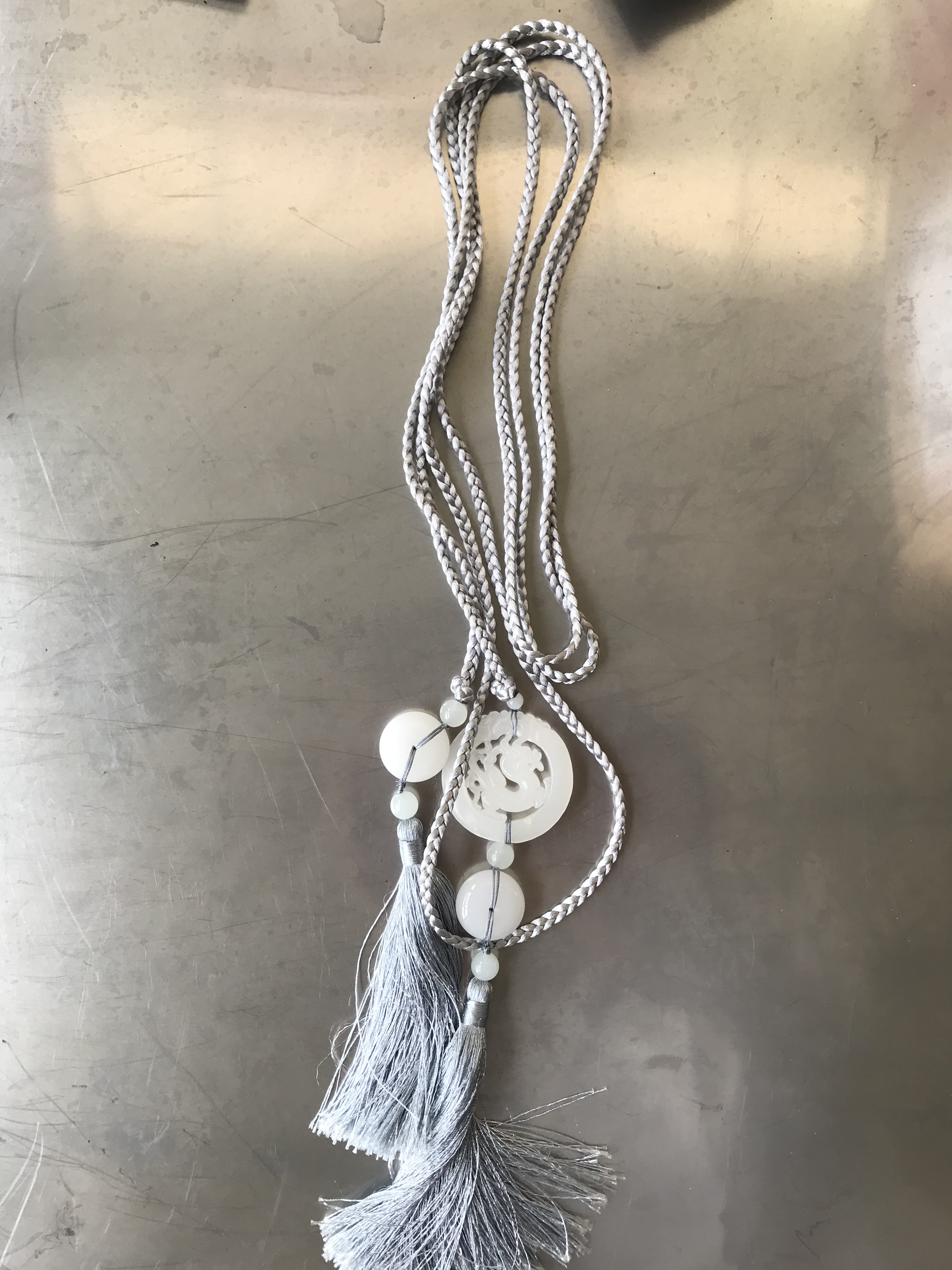
Waist belt with a jade pendant, a common belt accessory in hanfu

Belts and silk bands are commonly referred as dai (simplified Chinese: 带; traditional Chinese: 帶). Dai have been deeply connected to ancient Chinese clothing and just like the style of the ancient clothing have known changes over time, so did the dai. Belts were used as accessories for various civil and military officials, and they were used to distinguish their social ranks.

Types of Belts
Name	Description	Period	Images
Taodai	Silk belts or silk narrow bands, made of seven silk bands. Could be woven into 2 different ways.	Ancient - Unknown	
Ke (缂)	A narrow band; which could also be of one colour (su); sometimes used as a belt with jade daigou (帶鉤; belt hooks).	Ancient - Unknown	
Sitao (丝套)	Narrow silk bands, used as belts.	Ancient - Unknown	
Dadai (大带) or Shendai (绅带)	Silk sash; it was worn on top of the shenyi. The belt could have a decorative piece attached on it.	Ancient - Unknown	
Kua (銙)	Originated from belts worn in the Zhou dynasty; it was lined with plaques at variable distances, it also had rings or ornaments suspended from its lower edge in order to allow the wearer to attach objects (e.g. knives, tallies, etc.).	Han - Unknown	
Diexie (蹀躞)	Originated from belts worn in the Zhou dynasty; it was similar to the kua (銙) belt, except that it had strips of leather instead of rings. Some accessories like leather pouches could be attached to those belts.		
Guodu (裹肚) or Weidu (圍堵)	A separate piece of cloth, which has adornment, and was used to wrap the stomach of Han Chinese men.	Song dynasty - Unknown	
Kandai (看带)	An adornment belt. It is another belt which is worn on top of the belt worn around the waist for decorative purpose.	Song dynasty - Unknown	

Types of Belts hooks and buckles
Name	Definition	Description	Period	Images
Daigou (帶鉤)	Belt hook	One end has an elongated body with a knob that goes through the belt; the other end is a curled head that hooks on a loop, ring, or hole on the opposite end of the belt to keep it secure. Made of precious metals and jade; they were less ornamented in the Jin dynasty compared to the ones worn in the Han dynasty. Belt hooks could also be inlaid with yellow and white gold depicting motifs of animals.	Zhou - Jin	
Daikou (帶扣)	Belt buckles	Belt buckles with movable tongue. It was introduced during Jin dynasty from the North; originally it was used to secure horse gear instead of clothing.	Jin - Unknown	

== Neck and shoulder accessories, and ribbons ==
Types of neck and shoulder accessories, and ribbons
Name	Definition	Period	Images
Pizi	A cape; a wide and short cape which drapes over the shoulders.	Northern dynasties - Tang dynasty.	
Pibo (披帛) or peizi (帔子)	A shawl, or a long scarf; it is longer and narrower than the pizi (cape) and it drapes on the shoulder from back to front.	Tang - Unknown	
Xiapei (霞帔)	A woman's neckband which was trimmed with gold and lace. In terms of design, it looked closer to a long scarf; it was worn in formal dress. According to Ming's regulation, the Xiapei length had to be 5.7 chi and 0.32 chi width, with a suspended gold ornament at the end which purpose was to provide weight.	Ming dynasty	
Xiapei (霞帔)	A type of stole or tabard worn by women; it was developed from the xia pei worn in Ming dynasty. It was tied at the sides and reached below the knees. The bottom of the xia pei has a pointed hem. It was first worn by women on their wedding day, and later, they would wear on special occasions. It is also decorated with colourful tassels at the bottom of the end.	Qing dynasty	
Lào zi	Knotted ribbon decorations tied to the waist belt made of silk and cotton ribbon.	Ancient – Present	
Xian (襳)	Long ribbons which hung from the upper short skirt.	Wei, Jin and Southern dynasties	
Yunjian (云肩)	"Cloud shoulder" or "cloud collar"; its name is derived from its shape when it is laid flat as it looks like a cloud. It is a detachable collar worn on top of the jacket (and the xia pei in Qing dynasty). It fell around the collar onto the chest and shoulders.	Sui-Qing	
Fangxing quling (方心曲領)	Lit. “bent collar with a square center”. It is pendant-like accessory which falls on the overlapping front of a paofu. It was a notable feature of ceremonial court attire during Song and Ming dynasties. It is made of silk. It consists of a circle at the neck area and an open or solid square which hungs from the circle onto the chest area. The fangxin quling contains the symbolism of Heaven (circle) and earth (square), respectively.	Song - Ming	
Fangxing quling (方心曲領)	Lit. “bent collar with a square center”. It is pendant-like accessory which falls on the overlapping front of a paofu. It was a notable feature of ceremonial court attire during Song and Ming dynasties. It is made of silk. It consists of a circle at the neck area and an open or solid square which hungs from the circle onto the chest area. The fangxin quling contains the symbolism of Heaven (circle) and earth (square), respectively.	Song - Ming	Imperial Encyclopaedia - Ceremonial Usages - pic391 - 方心曲領

== Portable accessories ==
=== Purses and fragrance sachet ===
Hebao, Chinese purses or sachet, are currently used as a form of fashion accessory used by hanfu enthusiasts. They are often embroidered and can be decorated with tassels.

==== Yudai ====
Yudai tied at the belt of an official.

Yudai (Chinese: 鱼袋; lit. 'fish pouch'), also known as "fish-shaped tally bag", is a fish-shaped dai (Chinese: 袋; lit. 'pouch or bag'). It is a form of yufu (Chinese: 魚符; lit. 'fish tally'); the colour of the pouch corresponds to the colour of the officials' clothing thus indicating its wearer's rank or the special favour of the Emperor; it could be made of gold, silver, or jade. It was worn or hung on the belt of the court clothing. It was used from the Tang to the Ming dynasty.

=== Hand-held fans ===
Historically, fans have played an important aspect in the life of the Chinese people. The Chinese have used hand-held fans as a way to relieve themselves during hot days since the ancient times; the fans are also an embodiment of the wisdom of Chinese culture and art. They were also used for ceremonial purposes and as a sartorial accessory. So far, the earliest fans that had been found date to the Spring and Autumn period and Warring States period; these were made of either bamboo or feathers. The arts of fan-making eventually progressed to the point that by the Jin dynasty, fans could come in different shapes and could be made in different materials.

Historical fans

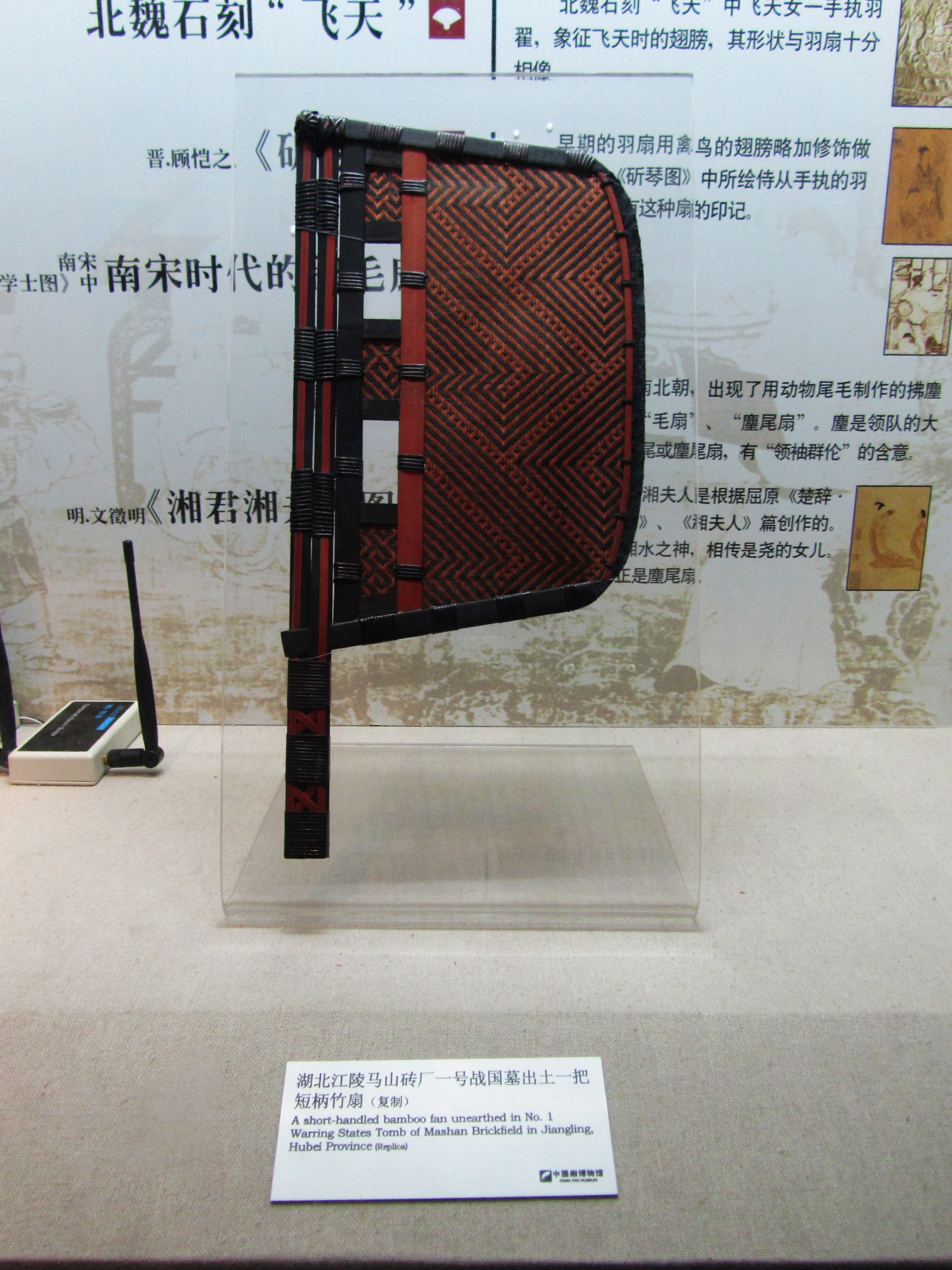
Replica of a Short-handled Bamboo Fan, Warring States period Tomb.

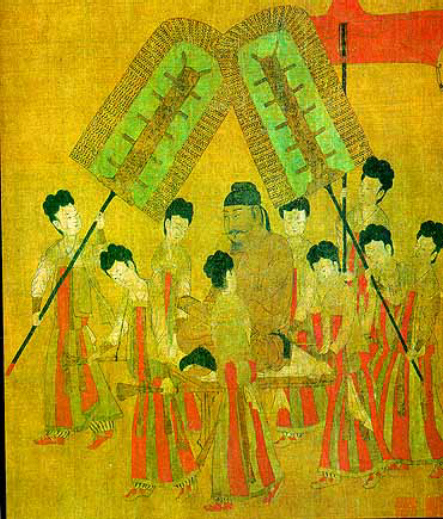
Female attendants of Emperor Taizong holding large oblong fans.

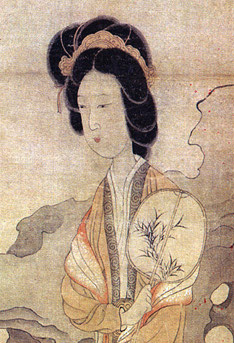
A woman holding a tuanshan, Ming dynasty

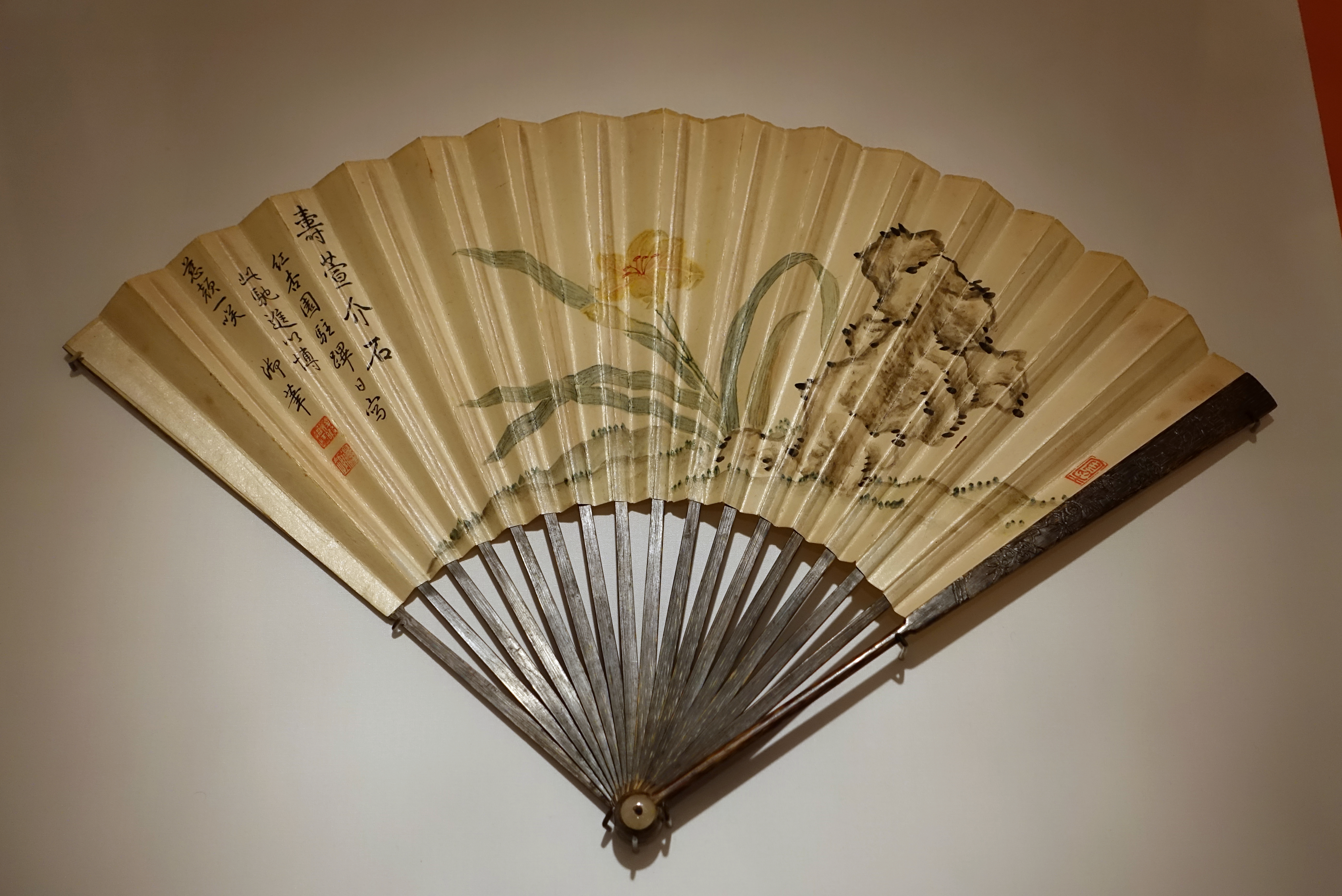
Folding fan with a Chinese painting and a Chinese poem, painted by the Qianlong emperor, Qing dynasty, 1762 AD.

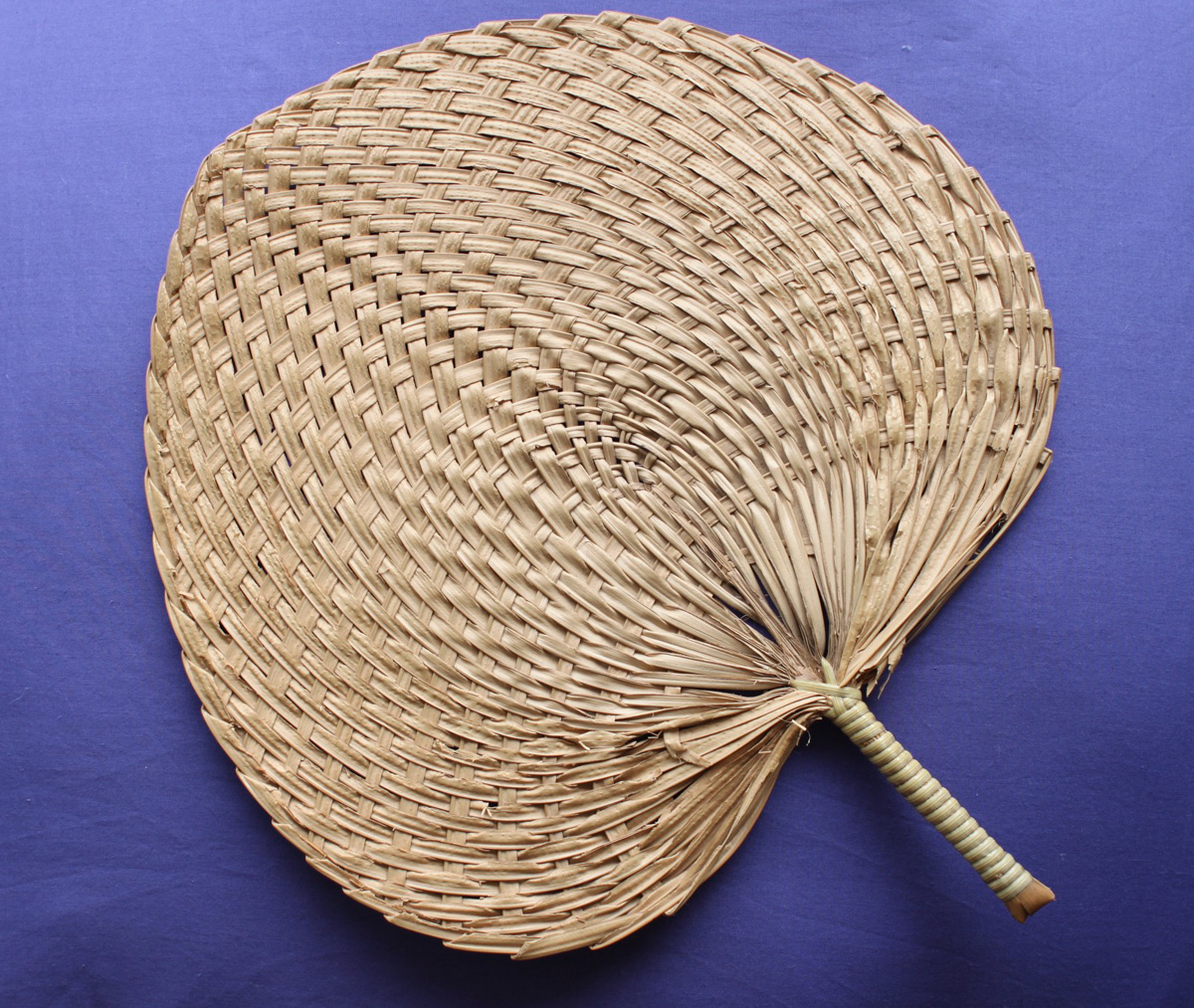
A pukui shan, a type of Chinese fan made with palm weaving.

Tuanshan (Chinese: 团扇), silk round-shaped fans, also known as "fans of reunion", is a type of "rigid fan". These types of fans were mostly used by women in the Tang dynasty and was later introduced into Japan. These round fans remained mainstream even after the growing popularity of the folding fans. Round fans with Chinese paintings and with calligraphy became very popular in the Song dynasty.

In 988 AD, zheshan (Chinese: 折扇; lit. 'folding fan') was first introduced in China by a Japanese monk from Japan as a tribute during the Northern Song dynasty; these folding fans became very fashionable in China by the Southern Song dynasty. The folding fans later became very fashionable in the Ming dynasty.

Another popular type of fan in history was the palmetto fan known as pukui shan (Chinese: 蒲葵扇), also known as pushan (Chinese: 蒲扇), which was made of the leaves and stalks of pukui (i.e. Livistona chinensis).

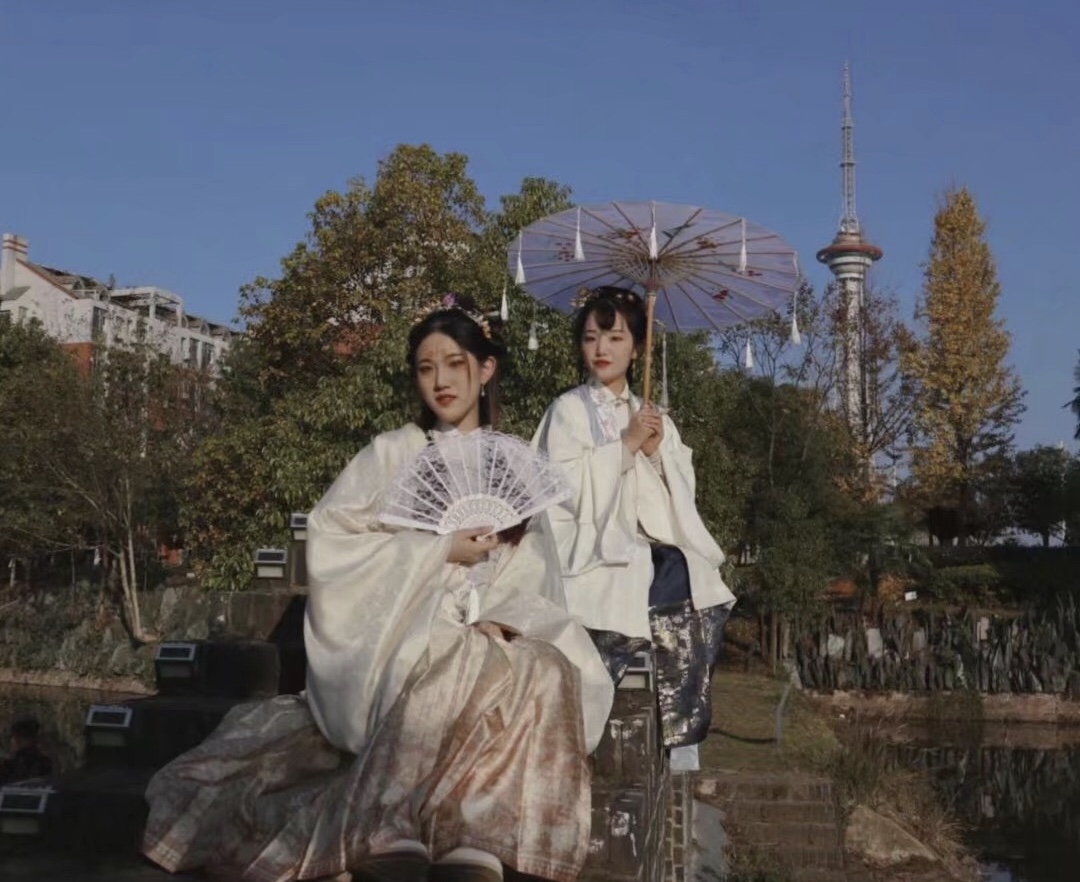
Hanfu enthusiasts carrying folding fan and oil-paper umbrella, 2021

Nowadays, both the zheshan and the tuanshan are both often used as accessories by Hanfu enthusiasts.

=== Oil-paper umbrella ===
Oil-paper umbrella is a common fashion accessory among Hanfu enthusiasts, who often used for photo-shooting purposes.

=== Musical instruments ===
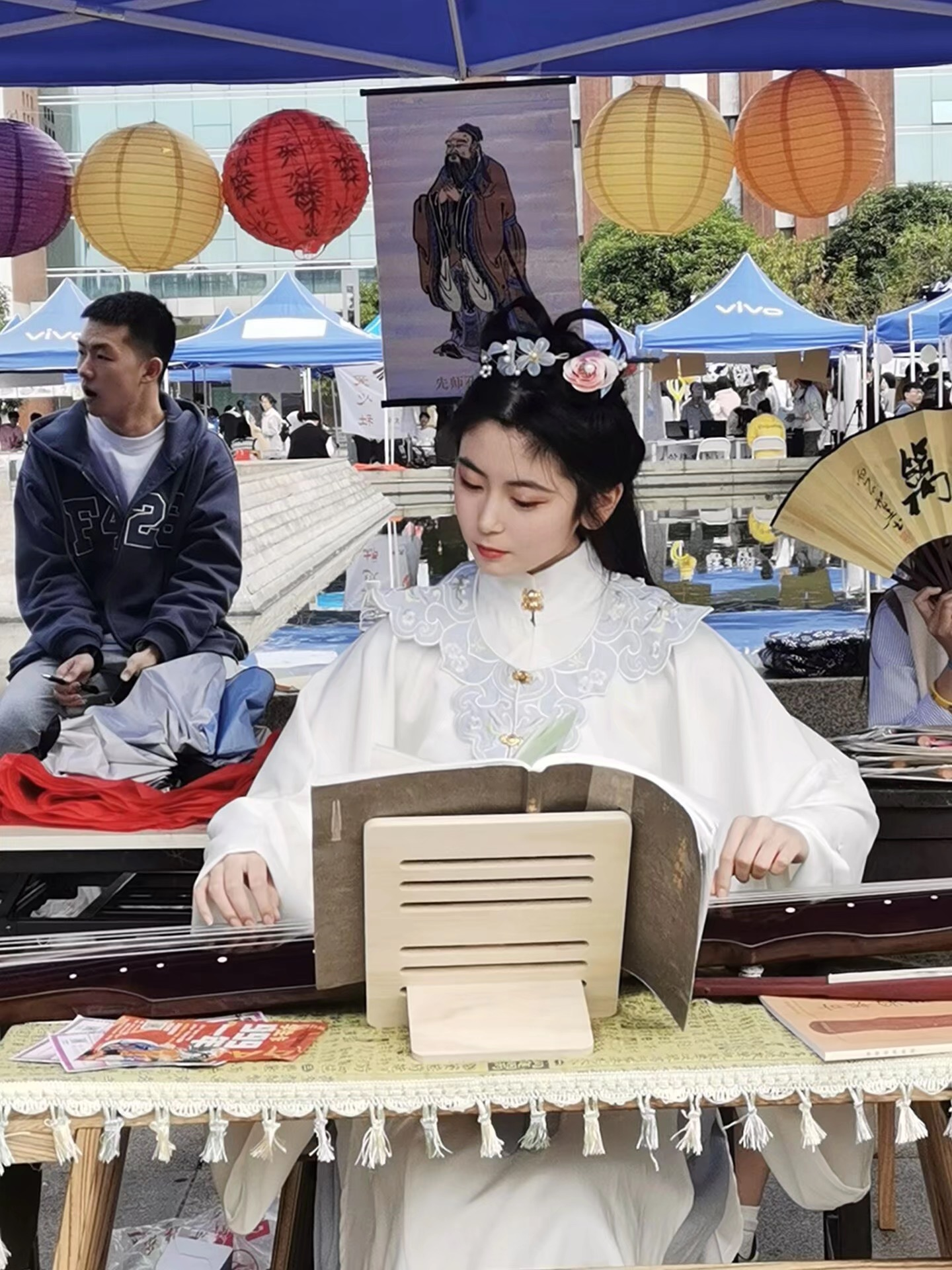
Hanfu enthusiasts playing guqin

Nowadays, Chinese musical instruments, such as dizi and guqin, are both common fashion accessory among Hanfu enthusiasts.

=== Weapons ===
In 583 AD during the Sui dynasty, civilian ownership of swords and spears were banned by Emperor Wen of Sui; the ban of daggers, knives, hunting forks and hooks followed by the year 604. This ban was soon lifted following the founding of the Tang dynasty, and according to the Tang legal code, people were allowed to carry light weapons, bows and arrows, swords, shields, and short spears and were only banned from using professional military weapons. This led to a cultural shift in the Tang dynasty where gallantry culture rose in popularity. This cultural shift also changed the symbol of swords in society, which became symbols of strength, courage, masculinity, righteousness. It thus became fashionable to carry swords as well as short weapons, such as knives and daggers. Sending swords as gifts to friends were also performed by some scholars:

"The shining, sharp sword, bringing peace to my mind. I always travel alone, so my old friend gave his sword to me as company. My heart is pure as ice and the sword is like snow. If I can't use the sword to execute those shameless people, I would rather break the blade and let my heart decay [...]"

— Poet Han Yu (768 – 824 AD), Li Jian (lit. "Shining Sword"), Politics and Identity in Chinese Martial Arts (2018) by Lu Zhouxiang

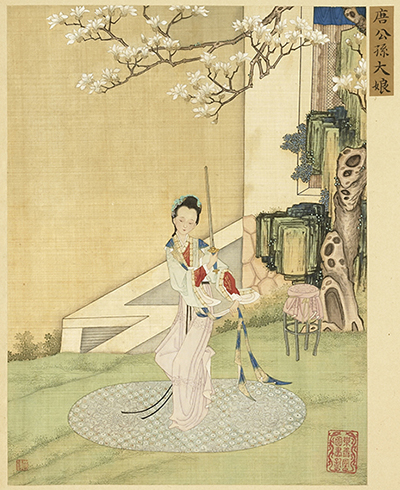
Sword dance in hanfu, from the painting "Gathering Gems of Beauty", Qing dynasty

Nowadays, swords remain present in traditional Chinese arts, such as the Chinese dance and Chinese opera. Sword dance (Chinese: 剑舞) and knife dance (Chinese: 刀舞) both evolved from Chinese martial arts, with the records of sword dance appearing as early as the Han dynasty. Chinese swords known as peijian (Chinese: 佩剑), are currently fashion accessories in hanfu and are often used by young male Hanfu enthusiasts being perceived as being indispensable on the road of chivalry and righteousness.

=== Tally and tablet ===
A tally is referred as fu (Chinese: 符; lit. 'tally') in Chinese.

Name		Definition	Description	Period	Images
Fu (Chinese: 符)	Hufu Chinese: 虎符; lit. 'tiger tally'), also called Tufu (Chinese: 菟符)	A tiger-shaped tally	A form of tally worn prior to the Tang dynasty; it was made of silver. It was eventually replaced by the yufu (Chinese: 魚符; lit. 'fish tally'), i.e. fish tally.	Unknown – Tang dynasty	
Fu (Chinese: 符)	Yufu (Chinese: 魚符; lit. 'fish tally')	A fish-shaped tally	A form of tally which started to be worn in 619 AD during the Tang dynasty; it was made of silver.	Tang – Song dynasty	
Hu (Chinese: 笏; pinyin: hù)			The hu was a flat sceptre-like item which originated in China and were originally used as narrow tablets for recording notes and orders and were used by officials.		
Yugui (Chinese: 玉圭), also called gui (Chinese: 圭)		Jade tablet or baton	A yugui was an elongated jade tablet, or flat sceptre-like item, which represented authority during the Longshan culture and continued to be used in the succeeding dynasties until the Ming dynasty. It was typically used by Chinese rulers (including the emperor) and nobles on ceremonial occasions. It was held in the hands when worn with ceremonial set of attires, such as the bianfu.	Longshan culture to Qing dynasty	

== Cosmetics and hanfu makeup ==
Cosmetics have a very long history in China but their origins are unclear. The cosmetic industry in China may have potentially originated in the Spring and Autumn period. According to the Shiwu jiyuan (lit. 'The Origins of Things') by the Gao Cheng of the Song dynasty, around the year 1100 BC during the reign of King Wen, women started to use powder and in the court of Qin Shihuang around the 3rd century BC, all imperial consorts and ladies-in-waiting were already using rouge as cosmetics and were drawing their eyebrows.

Red makeup was an important colour for facial cosmetics for the Chinese people; for example, in the Tang dynasty, red makeup included rouge and lip glosses made of cinnabar.

=== Cosmetic powder ===
Cosmetic powder is known as fen as it was made by the pounding and crushing of rice grains or qianfen (lead powder) in China. Another form of lead powder was known as Hufen which is made of lead, with the character Hu being associated with the Northern and Western ethnic groups in China. Cosmetic powder in China was made out of rice since ancient times and appears to have predated the use of lead powder. In the Han dynasty, women were not the only ones who used cosmetic powder, men also used it and this custom of men applying powder did not decline even during the Six dynasties period. By the time of the Six dynasties period, lead powder had become a mainstream cosmetics among the aristocrats and the practice of using lead powder became established by the Tang dynasty period.

==== Red makeup powder ====
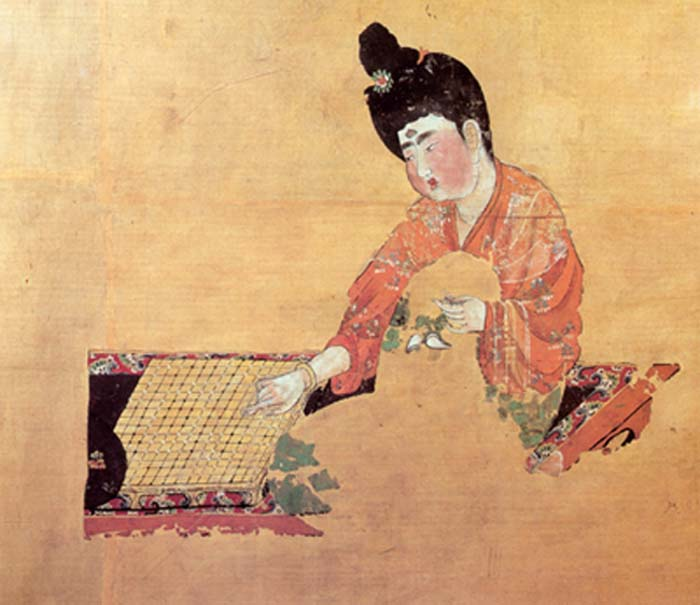
Red cosmetic powder applied on the face of a lady, Tang dynasty in a style known as taohuazhuang

When fen was dyed red, it became known as chengfen (double-dyed red applied). The chengfen was a makeup powder which was applied on the cheeks. In the Tang dynasty, women would apply rouge on their cheeks directly under their eyes.

==== White makeup powder and whitening skin product ====
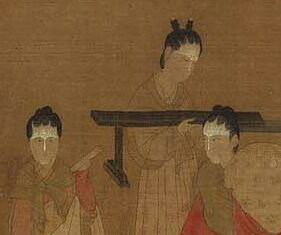
A woman with white powder on her face as a form of makeup

White powder to whiten the face made from rice was popular in China around 1500 BC. The use of white makeup powder made of freshwater pearls can be traced back to the Northern Song dynasty. In ancient times, not only the face had to be whitened but any exposed areas of the body such as hands, arms, and neck also had to be whitened. There was also a custom of applying powder on non-exposed body areas, such as the chest, shoulders, and back which can be traced back to the Han dynasty period.

The love for white skin in present-day China has nothing to do with racism. Light skin was a desirable trait for Asian communities, including the Chinese people, long before any contact with the Europeans instead it was due to it association with social economic and/or occupational status class, a concept which can be traced back to the Han dynasty when commoners, such as farmers and labourers, would work outside all day which resulted into darker, tanned skin tone, while those who came from a wealthier families could spend their days indoors and were spared from having to work outside in the sun. This belief continues to remain rooted in present-day China where white skin is believed to represent being part of the elite class; and thus, Chinese people continue to take a lot of measures to ensure that their skin remain white and beautiful. While Chinese people have traditionally favoured light skin tone as part of their traditional Chinese aesthetic; they did not favour the white skin tone of European people which was looked down as being pale and unhealthy as the colour white was the symbolic colour of death and mourning in traditional Chinese culture. Similarly, the association of white skin and beauty was introduced from China to Japan in the Tang dynasty, a period when Japan was heavily influenced by Chinese culture and not under Western influence; for example, during the Nara period (710–794 AD), Japanese women started to use whitening powder under the influence of the Chinese culture; and since then, the standard beauty ideal in Japan is light skin.

==== Yellow powder ====
From the 6th century through the Tang dynasty, it was fashionable for women to apply powder to their foreheads, especially yellow powder or pollen.

=== Nails ===
Nail polish was a popular cosmetic enhancement in early China and can be traced back to approximately 3000 BC. Chinese royalty used nail polishes which were gold, silver, black and red in colour and were made with bee wax, gum Arabic, and egg. Chinese aristocrats also coloured their nails in red and black with nail polishes which were made up of egg white, bee wax, and gelatin. The lower classes of society were forbidden from painting their nails in bright colours.

=== Ancient-style hanfu makeup ===
Types of Face Makeup
Name	Alternative names	Description	Period	Images
Huadian (Chinese: 花钿)	Shouyangzhuang (Chinese: 寿阳妆; lit. 'Shouyang make-up') and Meizhuang (Chinese: 梅妆; lit. 'plum blossom makeup')	A forehead decoration, which was popular in Tang and Song.	Southern dynasty - Song dynasty	
Ye (Chinese: 靥)		An artificial red dimple about 1 cm at each side of the lips. During High Tang period, they evolved and some could be found at the 2 sides o the noses and be found in various shapes (e.g. coins, peaches, birds, and flowers).	Tang - Five dynasties	
Xiehong (Chinese: 斜红; lit. 'red slant')	Originally called xiaoxiazhuang (Chinese: 晓霞妆), also called "Morning sun makeup" in English.	It originated in the Three Kingdom period, where women put a red mark on both sides of their faces to imitate Xue Yelai (薛夜来), Caopi's concubine, who had a scar at the temple of her face. It originally called xiaoxiazhuang due to its rosy colour of the early morning was and was later called "red slant", and it was at put at the tip of each eyebrow.	Three Kingdom Period - Unknown	
Taohuazhuang (Chinese: 桃花妆; lit. 'plum blossom make up')				
Tizhuang (Chinese: 啼妆; lit. 'weeping makeup')	Leizhuang (Chinese: 泪妆; lit. 'tears makeup')	A short-lived fashion trend, when powder and rouge were not popular on the face; and the only makeup that was worn is black lipstick.	Mid-Tang	
E huang (Chinese: 额黄; lit. 'Forehead yellow')	Yahuang (Chinese: 鸦黄)	A forehead makeup where women painted their forehead yellow, which is believed to be in imitation of Northwestern ethnic minorities.	Tang dynasty	
Yuanyang (Chinese: 鸳鸯; lit. 'mandarin duck')		It is an eyebrow makeup.	Tang dynasty	
Xiaoshan (Chinese: 小山; lit. 'small peak')		It is an eyebrow makeup.	Tang dynasty	
Chuizhu (Chinese: 垂珠; lit. 'drooping pearl')		It is an eyebrow makeup.	Tang dynasty	
Hanyan (Chinese: 涵烟)	Known as "dark fog" in English.	It is an eyebrow makeup.	Tang dynasty	

=== Modern hanfu makeup ===
Red makeup remain popular in Modern hanfu makeup of the 21st century with the use of red and/or pink eyeshadow.

== See also ==
- Hanfu
- List of Hanfu
- Hanfu movement
- List of Hanfu headwear

== Gallery ==
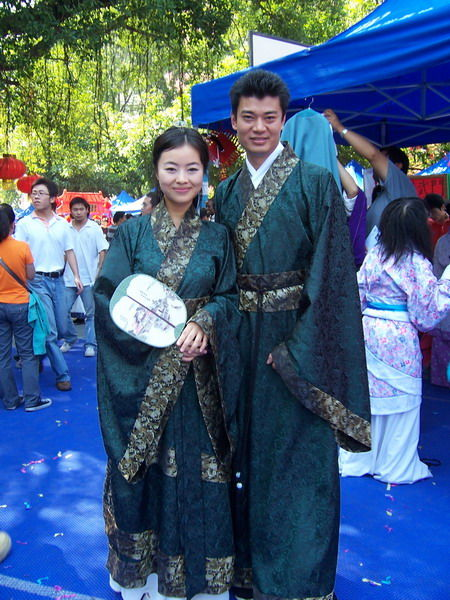
Hanfu enthusiasts in shenyi holding oblong-shaped tuanshan
