= Korean knots =

Traditional Korean handicraft

Korean knots, also known as maedeup (매듭), is a traditional Korean handicraft. The current form dates back to the Three Kingdom periods.

Korean knotting uses a unique braiding technique. Korean knotting is derived from the ancient practice of using knots for practical purposes; e.g. in fishing nets, agricultural tools, stone knives and axes.

Traditionally, the knots were used primarily to hold hunting tools around the waist and their usage was initially limited to royal families, spreading later to common people. Today, modern Korean artists are using the traditional knots in their works, such as accessories, jewelry and home interior decorations.

== Design ==
Korean knots are tighter than both then Chinese knots and Japanese knots; maedeup is also more three-dimensional than the other East Asian knots. Maedeup also has a longer tassel than the Chinese knots. Another main difference between Chinese and Korean knots is color and type of cord used.

The finished knot has the same shape at the front and at the back, has bilateral symmetry. It can be made using one or two threads.

== History of Korean Knots ==
=== Prehistory ===
In Neolithic times, Korean knots were used solely for practical purposes; they were tied around the waist and used to carry stone-axes, swords, and other tools used for hunting and food.

Tools that was used for sewing and knotting such as Garak-Bakwi, was excavated throughout various regions of Korea. Garak-Bakwi from the Stone Age exhibit holes where thread was looped through and then knotted. Similar evidence is found in relics of the Bronze Age. The knots were strengthened by twisting or weaving multiple strings.

=== Three Kingdoms of Korea (4th century - 668 CE) ===
The oldest record of maedup can be found in Goguryeo painting which dates from 357 AD. During the period of the Three Kingdoms of Korea, people began to see aesthetic value in knots. The Korean knot which used to be only for practical use developed in a form of decorative art.

People started to use them as decorations on clothes, swords, and more. The Samguk Sagi, the oldest extant record of Korean history, describes knot usage in everyday life during the Silla dynasty, noting rulers enjoyed using knots to adorn horses. It is also told that there was specific dress code for the nobles about designs of clothes, which includes knots during the King Heong-deok of Silla.

=== Period of the Goryeo dynasty (918-1392) ===
Formal knots are depicted in buddhist murals and paintings in the Goryeo dynasty. During this period, knots were widely used as ornaments in accessories and for art.

For example, In the Portrait of Lee Je-Hyeon, who was a civil vassal(Munshin) shows that the decoration of knots. Also, the specific style can be found in a blue-green celadon made during the Goryeo Dynasty.

=== Period of Joseon dynasty (1392-1910) ===
During the Joseon dynasty, knots became more diverse and elaborate. They were a symbol of high social status and it was considered a sign of dignity and prestige in the royal palace. They were used to decorate traditional instruments and clothes, especially women's garments and jewelry (e.g. necklace, pendants, and earrings). The Joseon rulers hired their own knot-makers to decorate the palace and jewelry for the noble family.

The particular crocheting skill called Dahoe and Mangsu was used when making garments for royal members, and there was special artisan in royal palace that specialized in such craft. In early era, the Dahoe artisan and Maedeup artisans were differentiated, but later the job has been overlapped, as Dahoejang, a Dahoe artisan is doing the both art.

=== Korea under Japanese Rule (1910-1945) ===
Demand for knots were so high among Koreans that knots became commercialized. But demand decreased after the Japanese enacted policies designed to obliterate Korean culture and a surge of Western culture into the Korean peninsula shifted traditions. They became rarely seen in public.

== Types of Korean knots ==
There are more than 30 basic types of knots. Some sources state that there is 38 basic knots. But there are vast numbers of variations and regional version on these basic types. Some of the most common knots include:

- Dalgi knot - this knot resembles a strawberry.
- Dorae knot - the most basic form of knot, it is used to connect knots and to fix or finish a knot.
- Guidorae knot - there are many different names that describe this type of knot, but is normally called the Guidorae. This knot tends not to be fixed.
- Gukwa knot (also written as "gukhwa") - chrysanthemum knot; when tied in plum and mauve threads, it apparently represents autumn and eternity. It is similar to the Chinese Pan Chang knot in construction.
- Maehwa knot - this knot resembles a Japanese apricot flower; and it is used for baby clothes and Norigae, Korean traditional ornaments worn by women.
- Nabi knot - butterfly knot.
- Saengjok knot - Ginger knot.

== Usage of Korean knots ==
Knots of diverse colors were used as belts, identity tags, and as a decorative element on instruments. In the ruling palaces, knots were used to signify dignity and prestige. For religious purposes knots decorated Buddhist ornaments.

The most common use of knots was in Norigae, traditional Korean ornaments worn by women to decorate clothing. Norigae were used by all ages and social statuses to emphasize the beauty of Korean traditional costume, as well as decorate pockets carried separately. Though these knots were used across all social statuses, there were also cases when only specific people were allowed to use them. For example, only high government officials were allowed to use knots for decorating fans.

== Korean Knots in modern Korea ==
After the establishment of a cultural industry bureau in South Korea in 1994, the use of knots modern life increased, especially in cultural products. Korean knots were also used in the designs of non-Korean artists, usually in forms of the Garackji knot (a basic knot used to fill space and give a classical touch) and the Mangsa knot (used on pouches for jewelry).

=== As a National Intangible Cultural Heritage of Korea ===
The skill of Maedeupt craft is designated as a National Heritage of South Korea in 1968. The special skill is succeed by lineage of artisans.

The first Maedueptjang who is designated as National Heritage was Jeong Yun-su, who was designated as master in 1968, who was succeeded by Choi Eun-sun in 1974. The skill is still being preserved by many succeeding artisans nowadays
