= Chinese knotting =

Decorative handicraft art

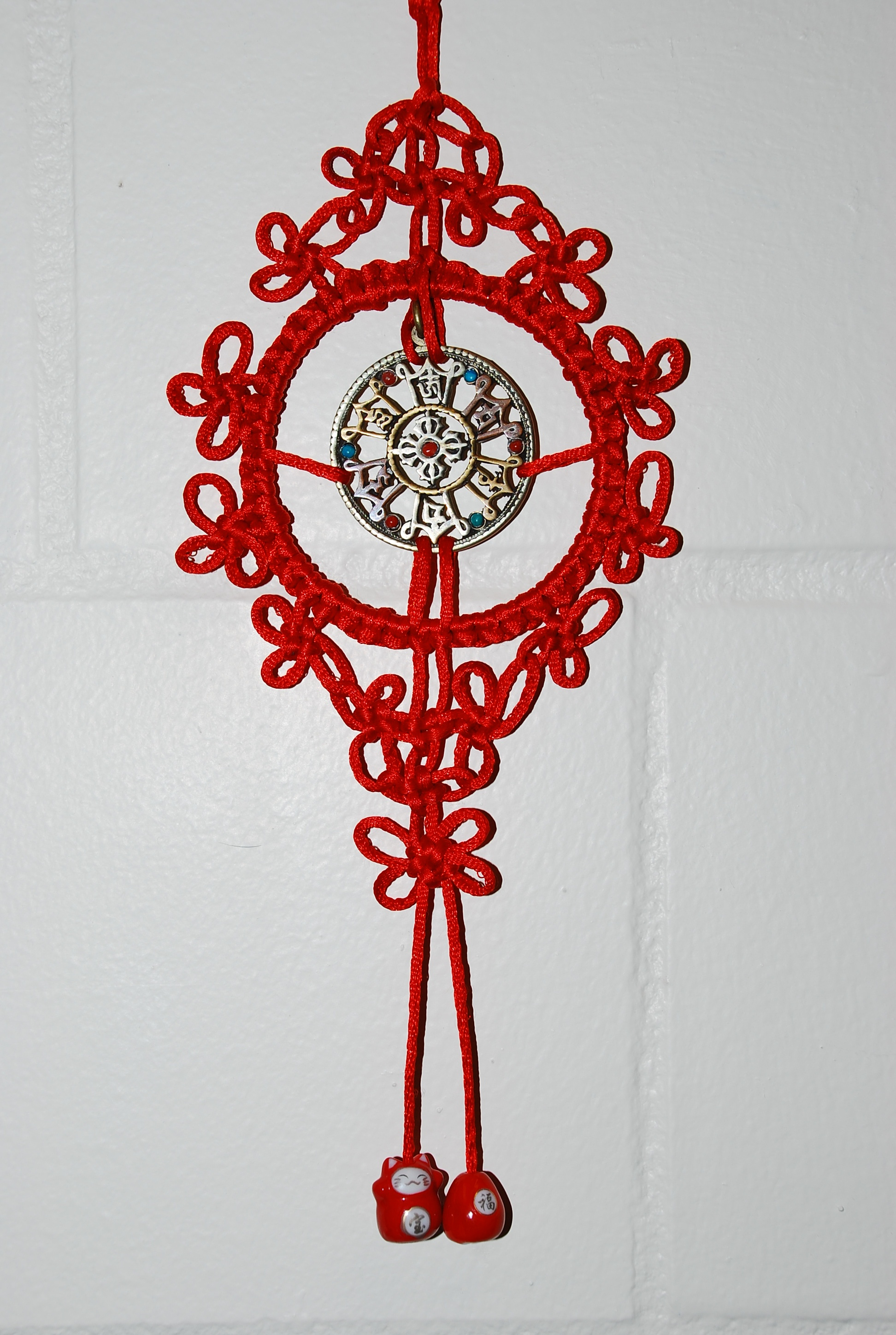
- Example of Chinese knotwork

Chinese name
- Traditional Chinese: 中國結
- Simplified Chinese: 中国结
- Literal meaning: Chinese knot
Transcriptions
Standard Mandarin
- Hanyu Pinyin: Zhōngguó jié

English name
- English: Chinese knotting/ Chinese knots/ Decorative knots

Chinese knotting, also known as zhongguo jie (Chinese: 中國結; pinyin: Zhōngguó jié), is a Chinese folk art with ties to Buddhism and Taoism. A Chinese knot is made from a single length of cord that is woven into different shapes, with each shape having a symbolic meaning. The most common color used in Chinese knotting is red, a color associated with luck in Chinese culture, although any color can be used. Charms, beads, and jade are sometimes incorporated into a Chinese knot. It is believed that Chinese knotting originated for recording information and exchanging messages before writing was commonplace. Traditionally, Chinese knots acted as good-luck charms to ward off evil spirits. Chinese knots are used today to decorate homes during festivities and are also commonly seen in traditional jade jewellery and traditional Chinese clothing.

== Characteristics ==
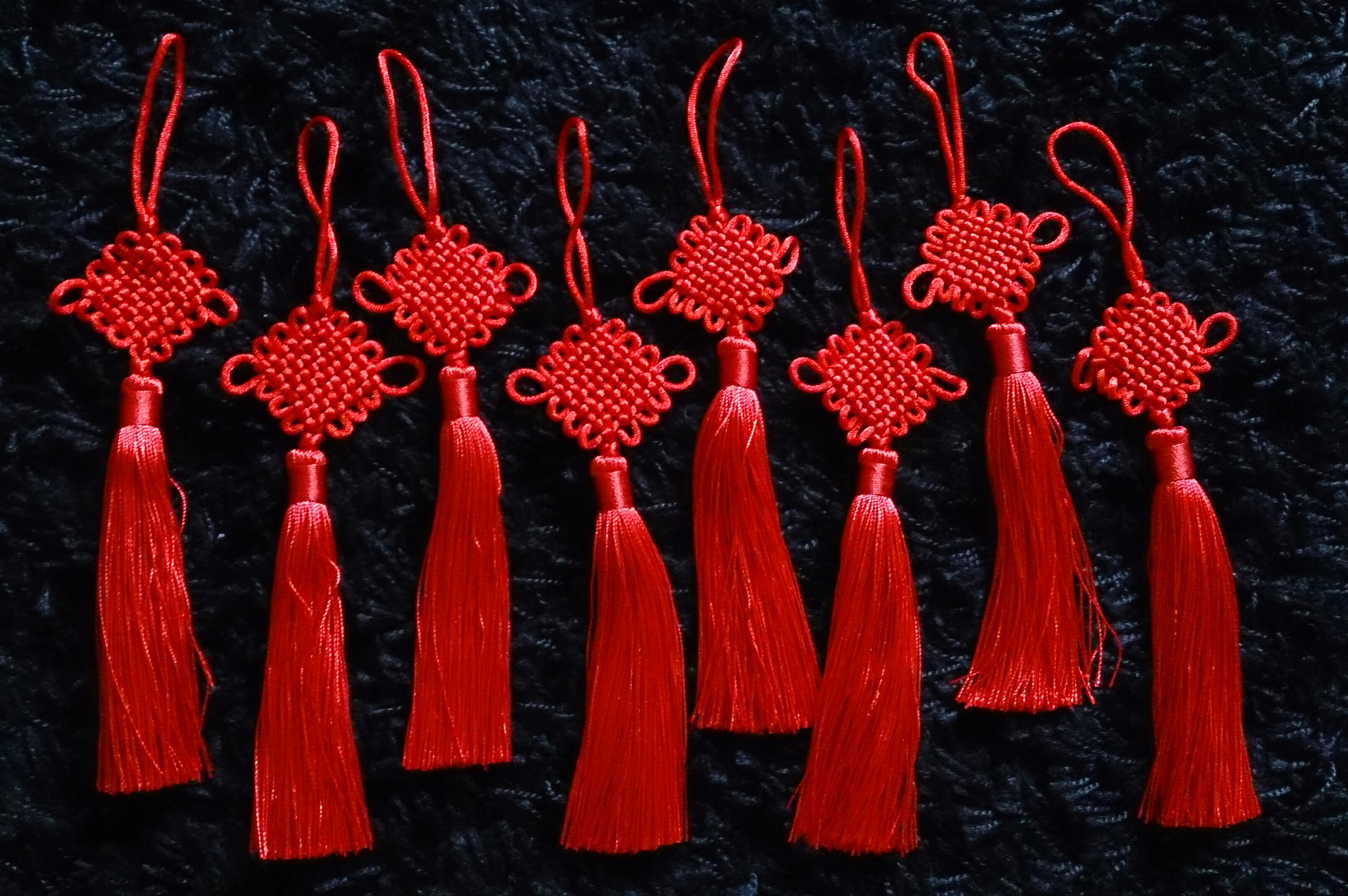
Eight tassel pendants made up of a type of Chinese knot and Chinese tassel

Chinese knots come in a variety of shapes and sizes. They are made from a single cord and are often double-layered and symmetrical in all directions. Satin cording is the most widely used material, especially when the knotting is done for clothing and jewellery; however, cotton, parachute cord, and other materials are frequently used as well. Knots are often paired with tassels, which are created separately and then incorporated into the main work.

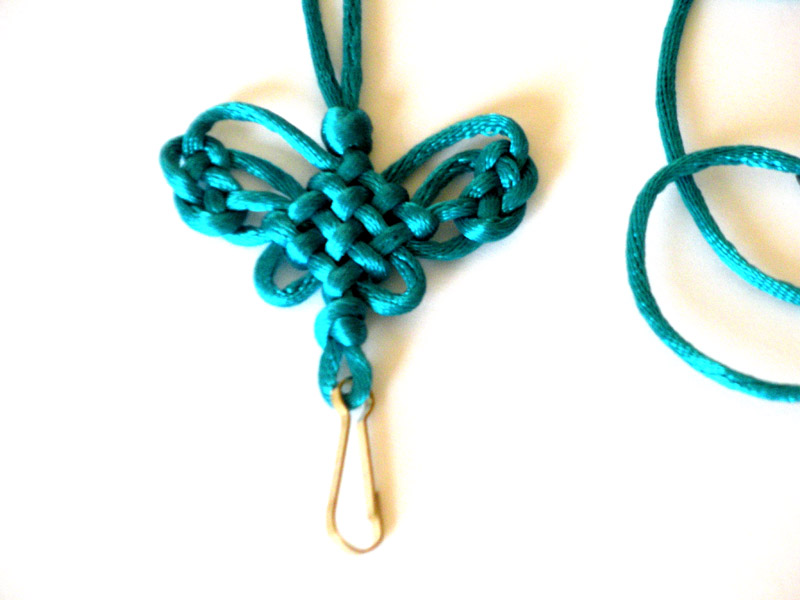
A Chinese butterfly knot lanyard with cross knots

Chinese knots are created in a variety of colors such as gold, green, blue, or black, though the most commonly used color is red, which symbolizes good luck and prosperity.

=== Types and shapes ===
Chinese knot scholar Lydia Chen lists eleven basic types of Chinese decorative knotwork. Complex knots are constructed from repeating or combining basic knots.

Types of Chinese knots
Name	Chinese name	Alternate names	Images
Chinese button knot	中國鈕扣結(traditional) 中国纽扣结(simplified)	Knife lanyard knot, Bosun whistle knot	
Cloverleaf knot	三葉草結 (traditional) 三叶草结 (simplified)	Four-flower knot, dragonfly knot; ginger knot (생쪽매듭, Korean)	
Cross knot	十字結 (traditional) 十字结 (simplified)	Square knot, friendship knot, Japanese crown knot	Front view Back view
Double connection knot	雙結 (traditional) 双结 (simplified)	Matthew Walker knot; dorae knot (도래매듭, Korean)	
Double coin knot	雙錢結 (traditional) 双钱结 (simplified)	Carrick bend, Josephine knot, Awaji musubi (淡路結び, あわじ結び, abalone knot); wing knot (날개매듭, Korean)	
Good luck knot	好運結 (traditional) 好运结 (simplified)	lovers knot (동심결매듭, Korean)	
Pan Chang knot	盤長結 (traditional) 盘长结 (simplified)	Coil knot, temple knot, endless knot, 2x2 mystic knot; chrysanthemum knot (국화매듭, Korean)	Pan Chang knots A 4-row Pan Chang knot with cross knots An 8-row Pan Chang knot with overlapping ears A 3D structure of a Pan Chang knot 3D structure of a Pan Chang knot (top view) 3D structure of a Pan Chang knot (side view)
Plafond knot	平結 (traditional) 平结 (simplified)	spectacle/glasses knot (안경매듭, Korean); caisson ceiling knot	
Round brocade knot	圓錦結 (traditional) 圆锦结(simplified)	six-flower knot; apricot/plum blossom knot (매화매듭, Korean)	
Sauvastika knot	萬字結(traditional) 万字结 (simplified)	Agemaki (Japanese), Sailor's cross; dragonfly wing knot (잠자리날개매듭, Korean)	

== History ==
Archaeological studies indicate that the art of tying knots dates back to prehistoric times. Discoveries include 100,000-year-old bone needles used for sewing and bodkins used to untie knots. Due to the delicate nature of the medium, little evidence of prehistoric Chinese knotting exists today. Some of the earliest evidence of knotting has been preserved on bronze vessels from the Warring States period (481–221 BCE), Buddhist carvings from the Northern dynasties period (317–581), and on silk paintings from the Western Han period (206 BCE – 9 CE).

=== Recordkeeping ===
Archaeological and literary evidence indicate that knots were used in China as a method of keeping records, especially to assist in governance. The practice had some similarities to the Incan practice of quipu. Several works of classical Chinese literature make reference to it. The Tao Te Ching (ca. 400 BCE) alludes to the practice in chapter 80. As translated by Wing-tsit Chan:

"Let the people again knot cords and use them (in place of writing)" [使民復結繩而用之]

The Yi Jing, Xi Ci II (ca. 168 BCE), describes the practice:

"In the highest antiquity, government was carried on successfully by the use of knotted cords (to preserve the memory of things). In subsequent ages the sages substituted for these written characters and bonds. By means of these (the doings of) all the officers could be regulated, and (the affairs of) all the people accurately examined."

The Eastern Han (25–220 CE) scholar Zheng Xuan, who annotated the Yi Jing, wrote that:

"Big events were recorded with complicated knots, and small events were recorded with simple knots." [事大，大结其绳；事小，小结其绳].

The chapter of Tubo (Tibet) in the New Book of Tang says:

"The government makes the agreement by tie cords due to lack of characters." [其吏治，无文字，结绳齿木为约].

=== Ancient totem ===
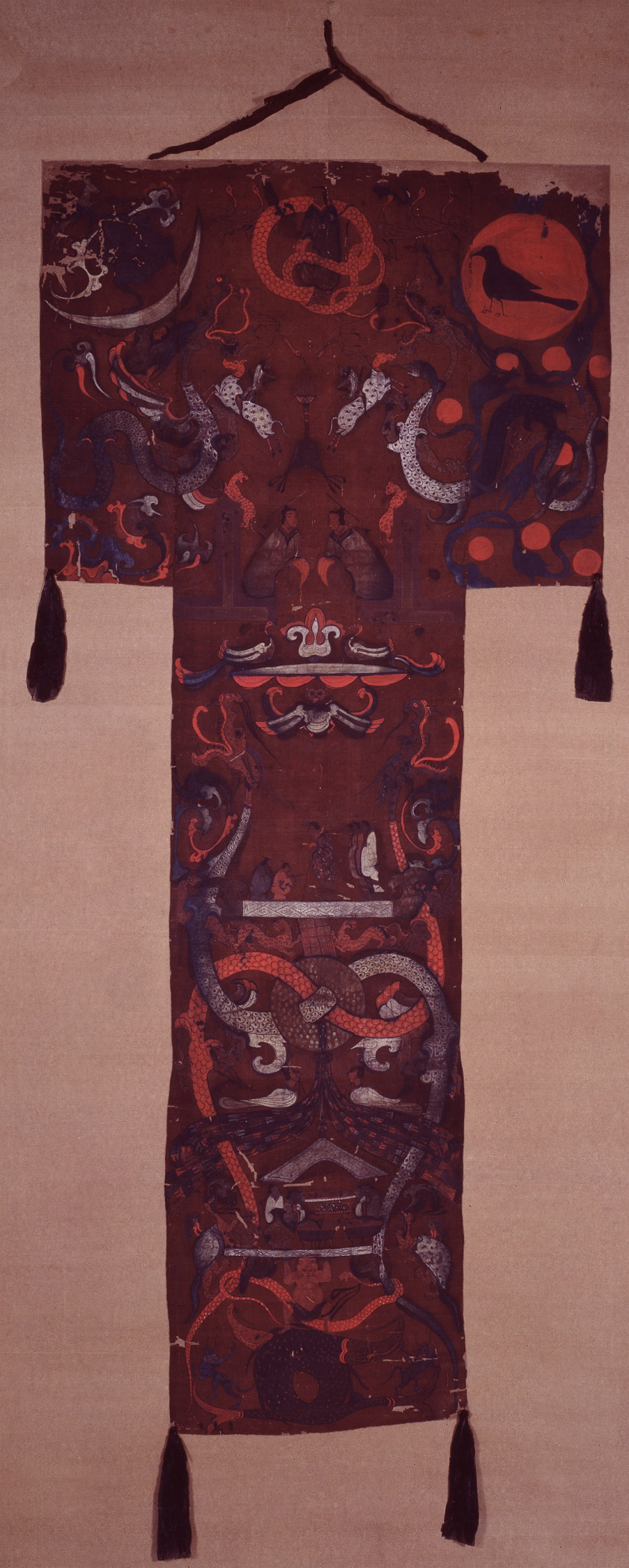
Mawangdui silk banner from tomb no1

In addition to their use in recording, knots became a totem and belief motif. A double coin knot pattern painting on a silk banner was discovered by archaeologists in the Mawangdui tombs (206 BCE – CE 9). The pattern is of intertwined dragons forming a double coin knot in the middle of the fabric painting. The upper part of the fabric painting depicts the ancient deities Fuxi and Nüwa, the initiators of marriage in China, from whom many ancient poems derive "love" as a meaning of the double coin knot. There is evidence from the 3,000-year-old Yinxu oracle bone script that knots were recognized as symbols rather than for functional use.

=== Decorative art ===
According to Lydia Chen, the earliest tangible evidence of knots as a decorative motif is on a small high-stemmed square pot from the Spring and Autumn period (770–476 BCE), which is now displayed in the Shanxi Museum. However, archaeology research has found that the earliest decorative knot artifact in China can be traced back to 4000 years ago, when a three-row rattan knotting of a double coin knot was excavated from Liangzhu ruins.

Knots gradually evolved into a distinct decorative art in China, beginning with the use of ribbon knotting and decorative knots on clothing during the Spring and Autumn period. This is attested in the Zuo Zhuan, where it is written that:

"The collar has an intersection, and the belt is tied as knots." [衣有襘．帶有結]

Chinese knotting was thus derived from the Lào zi culture. The Chinese word Lào is an ancient Chinese term for knots, and it was customary to tie a knot at the waist with silk or cotton ribbon.

==== Sui to Ming dynasties ====
The Sui and Tang dynasties (581–906 CE) saw the first peak of the Lào zi culture when basic knots, such as the Swastika knot and the round brocade knot, became popular adornments on garments, both among the nobility and the commoners. Knots were cherished not only as symbols and tools, but also as an essential part of everyday life to decorate and express thoughts and feelings.

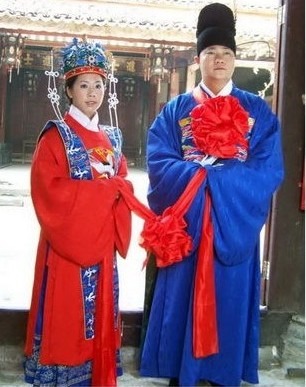
Bride and groom in traditional Chinese wedding dress holding the Concentric knot.

In the Tang and Song dynasty (960–1279 CE), the love-based knot became an important symbol, as evidenced in many of the poems, novels, and paintings of the era. In the memoir Dongjing Meng Hua Lu (東京夢華錄) written by Meng Yuanlao, it is observed that in the traditional wedding custom, a Concentric knot needed to be held by the bride and groom. Other ancient poems used the Concentric knot to portray love, such as Luo Binwang's poem:

"Knot the ribbon as the Concentric knot, interlock the love as the clothes." [同心结缕带，连理织成衣].

It was also mentioned in a poem written by Huang Tingjian:

"We had a time knotting together, loving as the ribbon tied." [曾共结，合欢罗带].

The most famous poem about the Love knot was written by Meng Jiao in Jie Ai (结爱 – lit. 'Bond of Love').

The phenomenon of knot-tying continued to steadily evolve over thousands of years with the development of more sophisticated techniques and increasingly intricate woven patterns. During the Song and Yuan dynasties (960–1368), the Pan Chang knot, today's most recognizable Chinese knot, became popular. Much artwork evidence has also shown the knots as clothing decoration during the Ming dynasty (1368–1644); for instance, in Tang Yin's artwork, a knotting ribbon is clearly shown.

Chinese knots in paintings

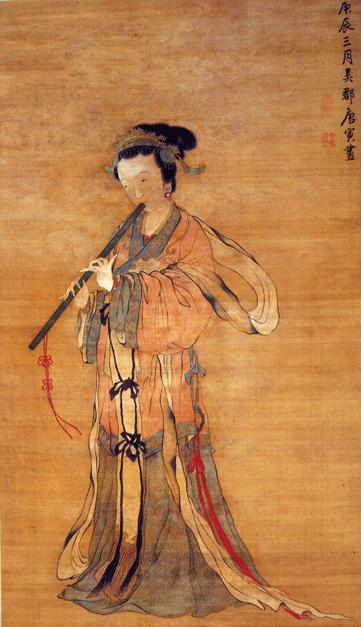
Painting by Tang Yin, 1520.

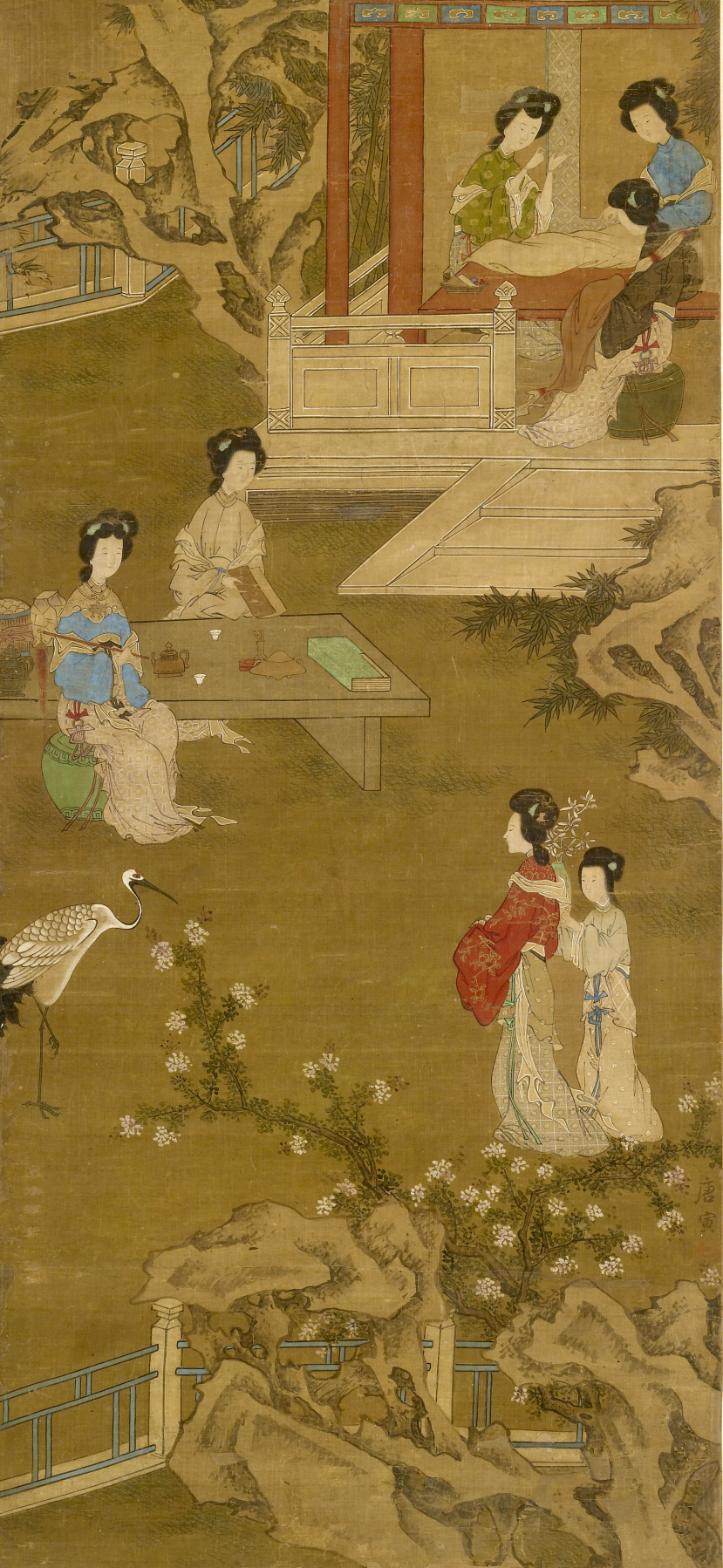
Making the Bride's gown, between 1700 and 1825, Qing dynasty

==== Qing dynasty ====
During the Qing dynasty (1644–1911), Chinese knotting evolved from folklore to an acceptable art form in Chinese society. The Lào zi culture again became popular during the Qing dynasty. During that time, basic knots were widely used to embellish everyday objects such as ruyi, sachets, purses, fan tassels, spectacle cases, and rosaries, and the single knot technique was extended into complicated knots.

Chinese knots in daily items

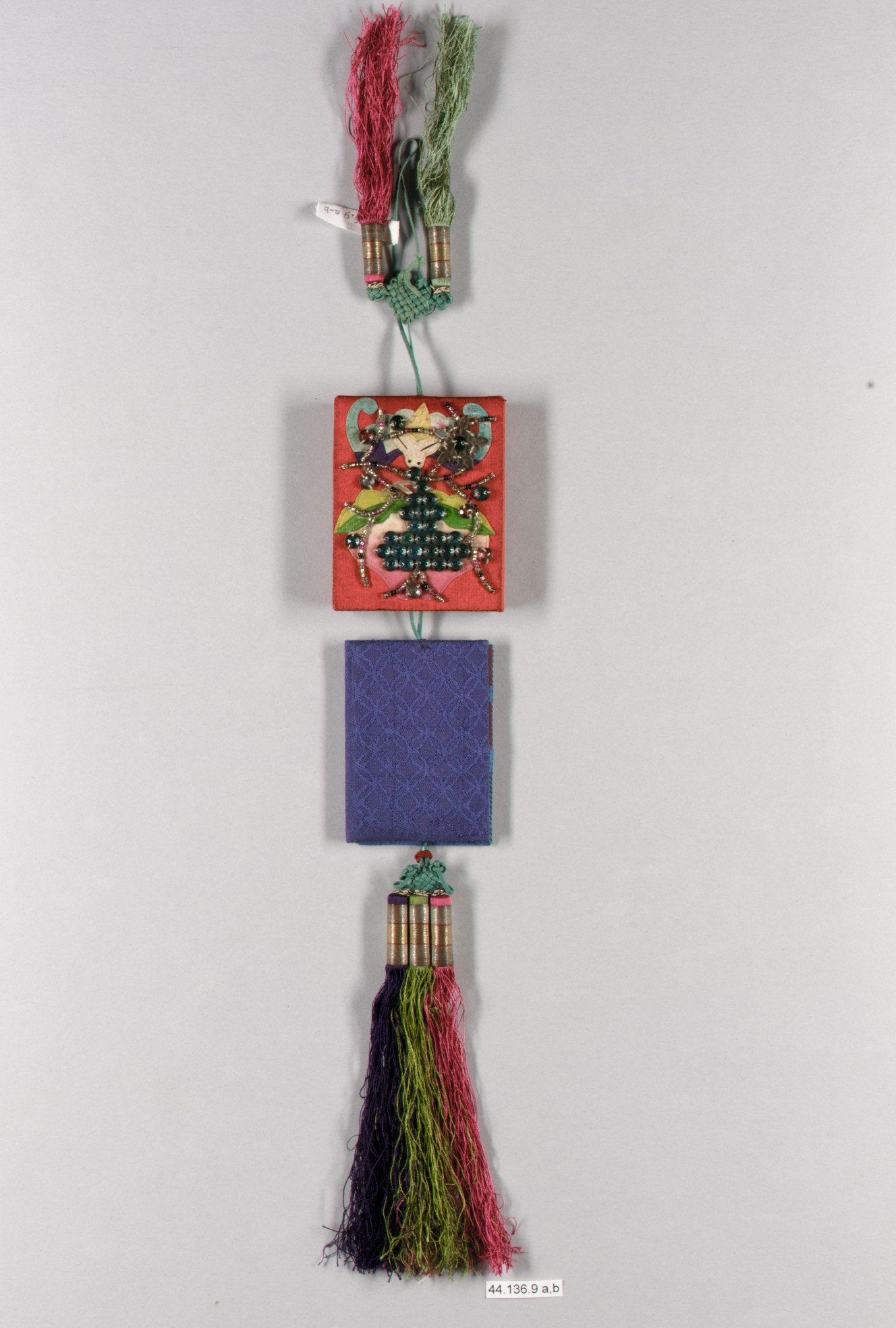
Mirror and needle case

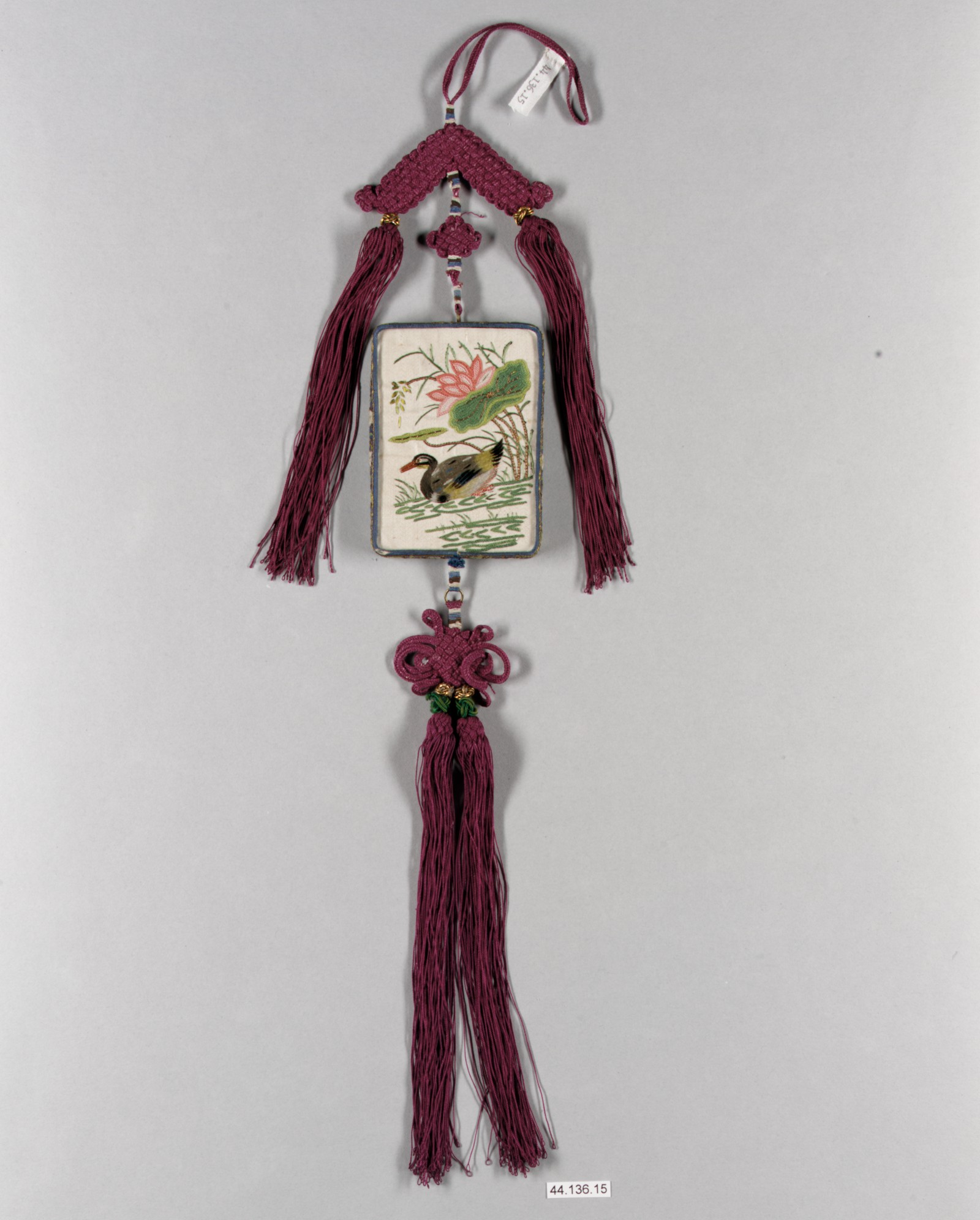
Mirror

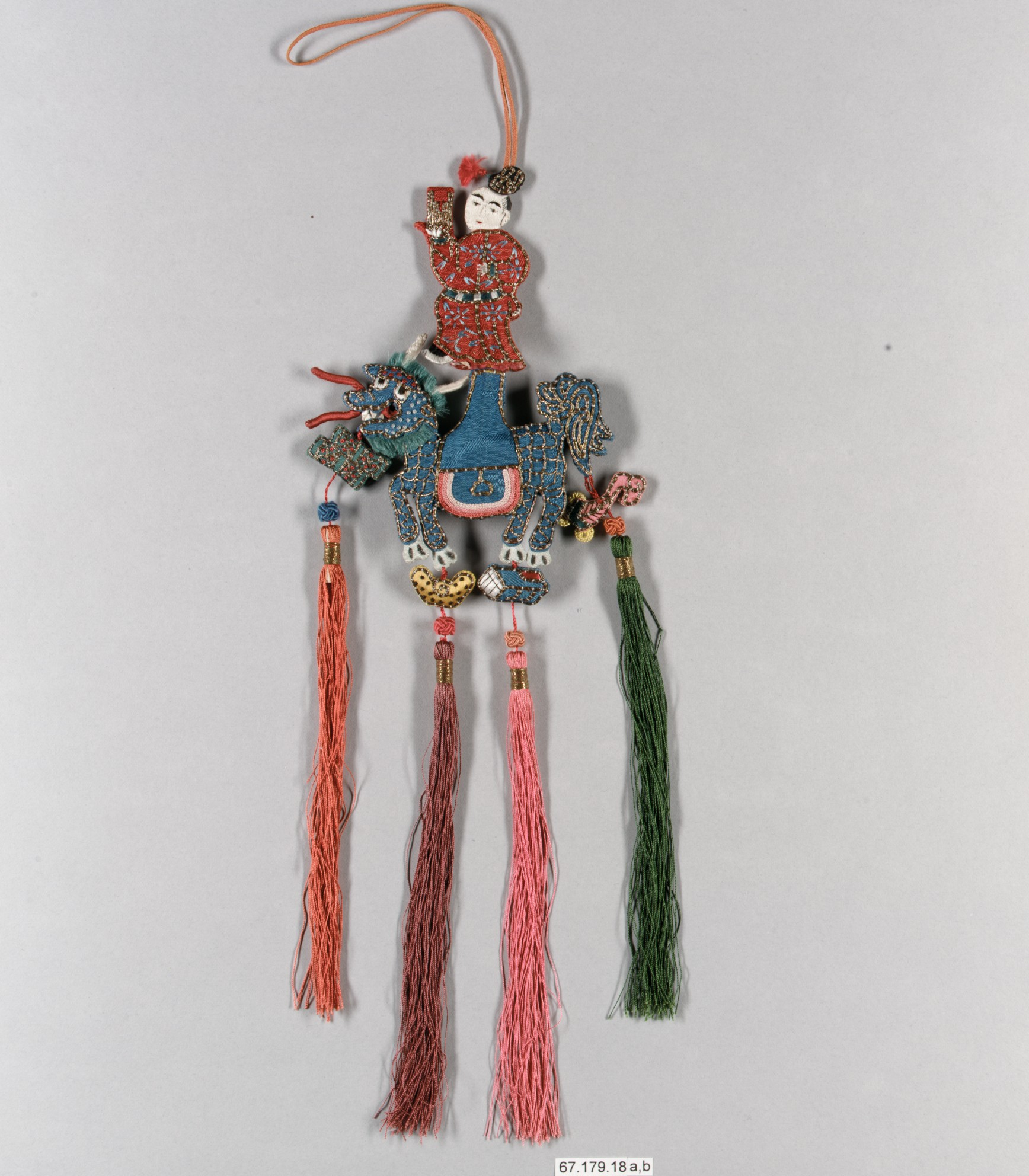
Toy

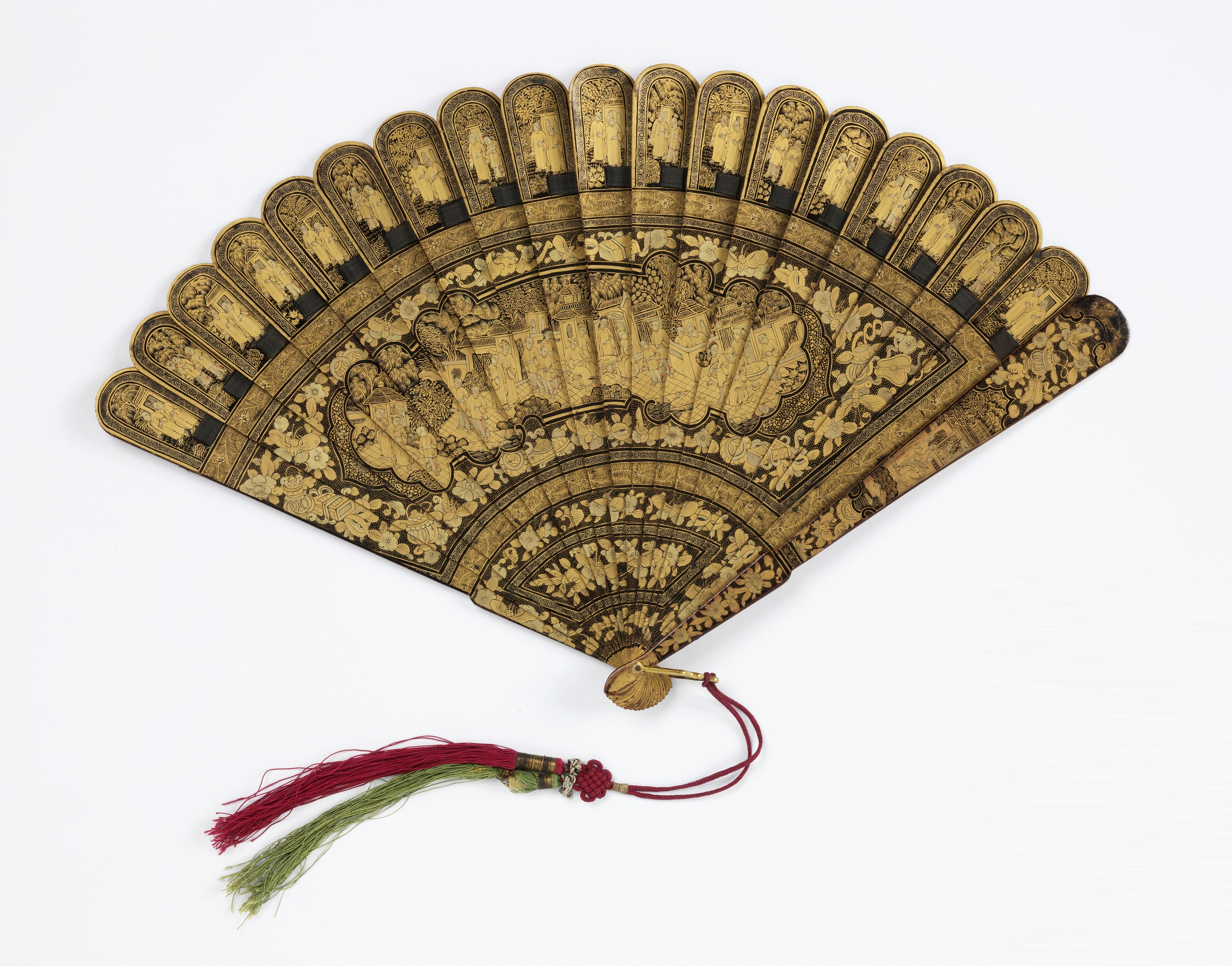
Brisé Fan

Objects decorated with Chinese knots dating from the Qing dynasty, 19th century

According to the Chinese classical novel Dream of the Red Chamber, the Lào zi was developed and spread between the middle and upper nobility, who used Lào zi as a way to express love and luck between family members, lovers, and friends. It was also a form of honorable craftsmanship studied and created by maids in the Imperial Palace. As written in the Gongnü Tan Wang lu (宫女谈往录), when knotting, the maids of Ci Xi were able to quickly produce many different knots.

==== Republic of China ====
There was little development of knotting during the Republic of China (1912–1949). Simpler knots were popular, for example the pan kou, which had been developed before the Qing dynasty, used knot button ornaments designed particularly for the cheongsam in this period.

=== 20th and 21st centuries ===
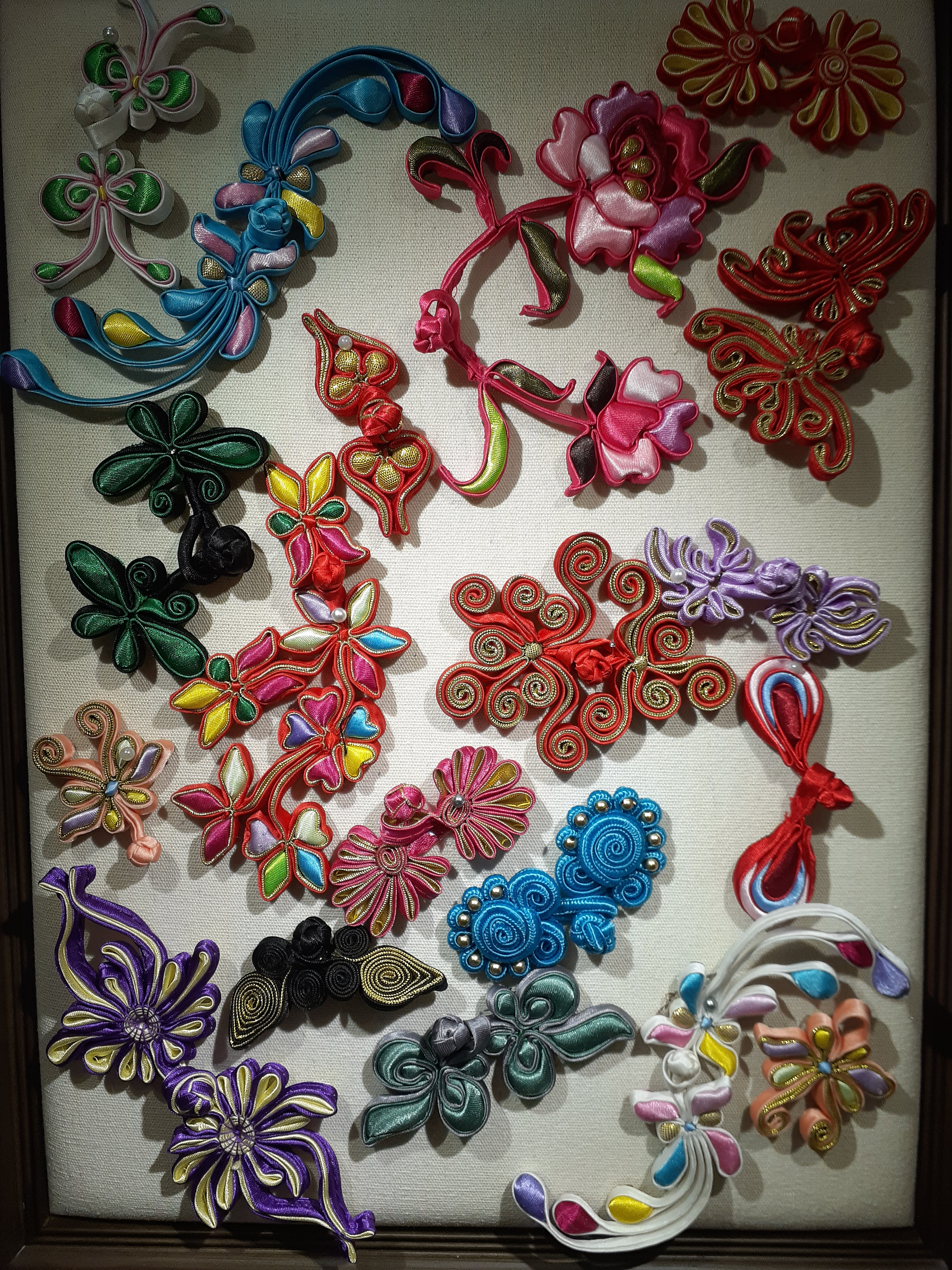
Variety of pan kou typically used as a fastener for the cheongsam

Knowledge and interest in Chinese knotting had declined considerably by the 1970s, when Lydia Chen helped bring about a renewal of interest in the art form through the Chinese Knotting Promotion Center. Chinese knotting has since become a popular symbol and souvenir in festivals and commodity markets.

The use of pan kou on clothing and knots as a folk craft remains alive in China.

== Influences and derivatives ==
=== Japan ===
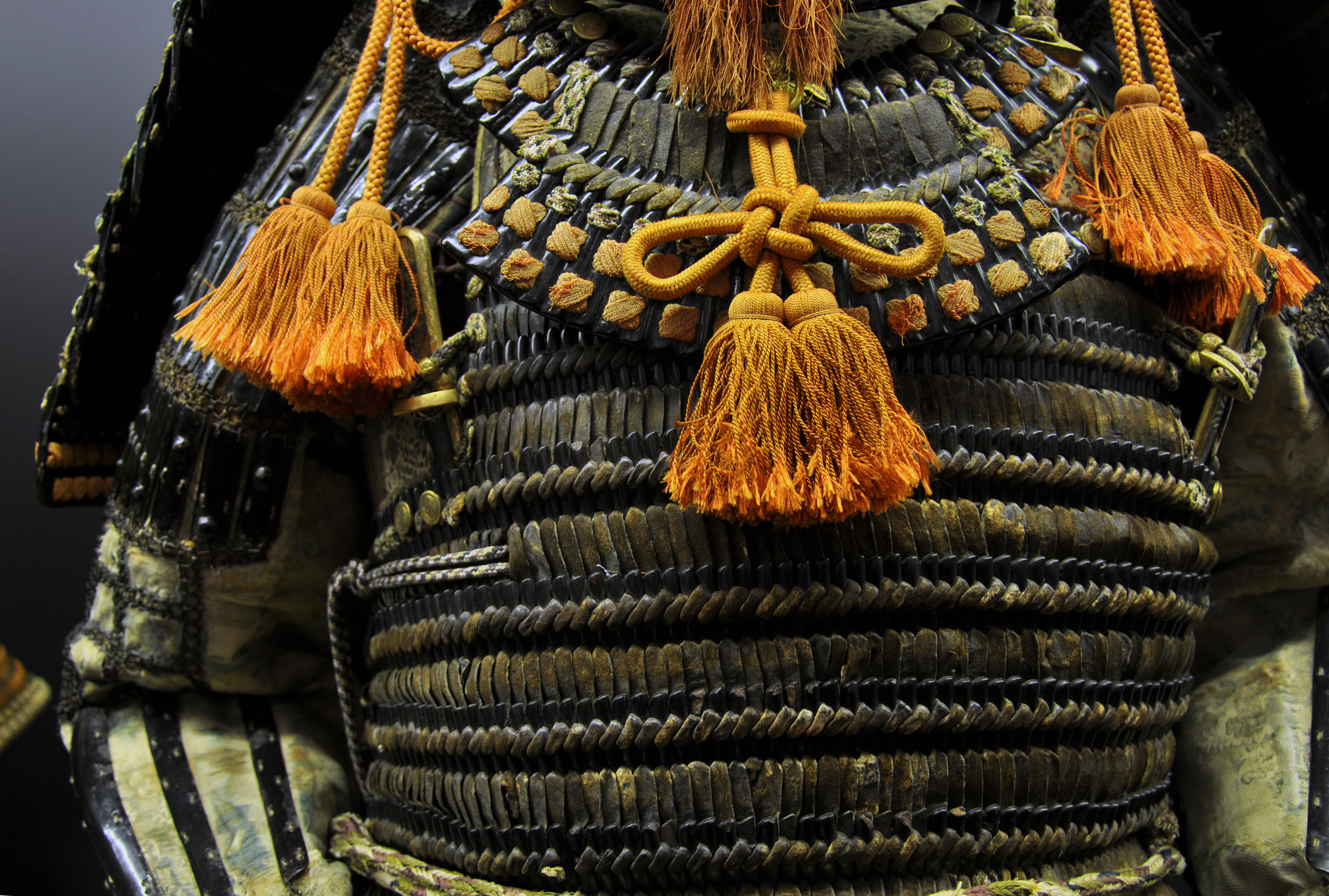
An agemaki knot

The knot-tying tradition in Japan is called hanamusubi, a term composed of the words hana, meaning "flower", and musubi, meaning "knot".

The hanamusubi is a legacy of the Tang dynasty of China, when a Japanese Emperor in the 7th century was so impressed by Chinese knots which were used to tie a gift from the Chinese that he started to encourage Japanese people to adopt the practice.

Japanese knots are more austere, formal, simple, and structurally looser than the Chinese knots. In function, Japanese knots are more decorative than functional. With a greater emphasis on the braids that are used to create the knots, Japanese knotting tends to focus on individual knots.

=== Korea ===
In Korea, decorative knot work is known as maedeup (Korean: 매듭), often referred as Korean knotwork or Korean knots in English.

The Korean knotting techniques is believed to originate from China, from which Korean knots evolved into its own culture in terms of design, color, and incorporation of local characteristics. The origins of maedeup date back to the Three Kingdoms of Korea in the first century CE. Maedeup articles were first used at religious ceremonies.

A wall painting from 357 CE found in Anak, Hwanghae Province, now in North Korea, indicates that silk was the primary medium at the time. Decorative cording was used on silk dresses, to ornament swords, to hang personal items from belts for the aristocracy, and in rituals, where it continues now in contemporary wedding ceremonies. Korean knotwork is differentiated from Korean embroidery. Maedeup is still a commonly practiced traditional art, especially among the older generations.

The most basic knot in maedeup is called the dorae (or the double connection knot). The dorae knot is used at the start and end of most knot projects. There are approximately 33 basic Korean knots which vary according to the region they come from. The bongsul tassel is noteworthy as the most representative work familiar to Westerners, and often purchased as souvenirs for macramé-style wall-hangings.

== See also ==
- Chinese art
- Chinese folk art
- Chinese paper cutting
- Chinese paper folding
- Endless knot
  - China: Pan kou; Lào zi
  - Japan: Mizuhiki
  - Korea: Norigae
- List of Japanese tea ceremony equipment#Shifuku
- Macrame
