= Aslı Filinta =

Turkish fashion designer

- Education: Bilkent University
- Occupation: Fashion designer
- Years active: 2008–present
- Website: aslifilinta.com

Aslı Filinta is a Turkish fashion designer. She founded a label under her own name in New York in 2008. Her collections have drawn on Anatolian and Ottoman visual traditions and on upcycled Turkish fabrics. In 2019 she showed a collection in the former Zülfaris Synagogue in Istanbul. Her later work has involved production with women's craft cooperatives in Turkey.

== Early life and education ==
Filinta is from Adana, Turkey. She took an economics degree at Bilkent University in Ankara and worked in finance before moving to New York, where she founded her label.

== Career ==
In 2009 Filinta's work was carried at the Vogue Nippon × Comme des Garçons "Magazine Alive" store in Minami-Aoyama, Tokyo. In July 2013 she gave a solo presentation of a sportswear collection, "The New World", inspired by the Ottoman mapmaker Piri Reis, as part of the Istanbul Next showcase of Turkish designers.

Her 2014 collection took the Ottoman architect Sinan as its starting point; she has also worked from the poetry of Rumi and from Ottoman cartography.

In March 2019 Filinta presented her autumn–winter collection at Mercedes-Benz Fashion Week in Istanbul, staging the show in the former Zülfaris Synagogue in Karaköy. The building housed the Turkish Jewish Museum until 2015. Filinta told The Forward that she had chosen the former synagogue "not as a bold statement but to complete my story". The garments were made from upcycled Turkish materials such as kutnu silk, crinkled cotton and macramé lace. The duo İnsanlar performed live on the bağlama.

== Production work ==
Early in the COVID-19 pandemic Filinta's workshop began sewing uniforms; the Middle East edition of T Magazine reported that the effort eventually produced some 20,000.

Filinta worked in the Hatay region after the earthquakes of February 2023, where she took up cimem, a declining local craft of weaving wheat straw. According to the same report, a commission for a beauty brand produced some 10,000 cimem bags from upcycled straw and provided work for around 350 women. In 2025 she founded the BİZ Collective in Antakya, which places design and production work with women's cooperatives and regional artisans.
