= Shūgi-bukuro =

Japanese envelopes for monetary gifts

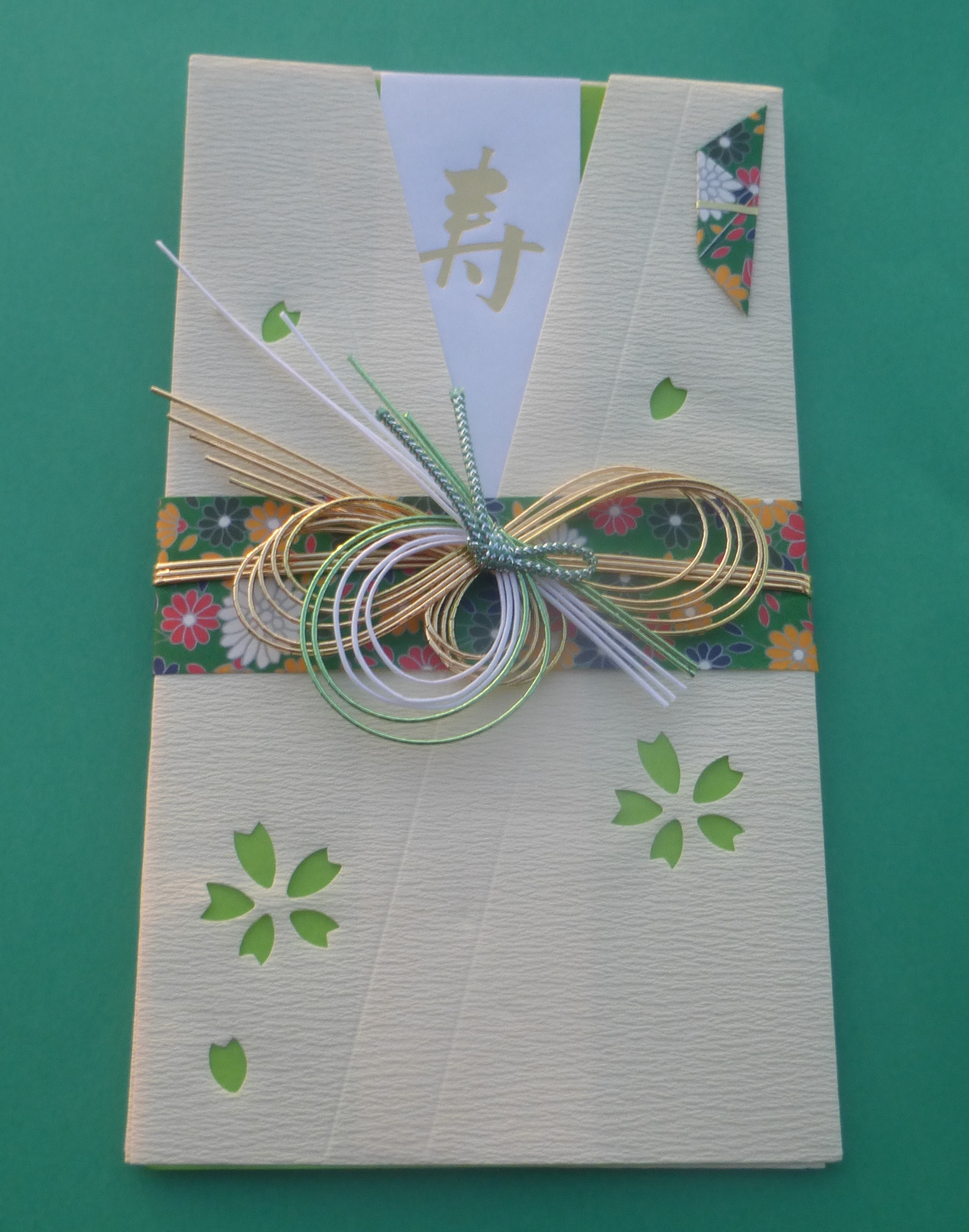
An example of a shūgi-bukuro

A shūgi-bukuro (祝儀袋, lit. 'celebratory gift bag') is a special envelope in which money is given as a gift of celebration in Japan, especially at weddings or other auspicious occasions, such as a birth or celebrating a new home. (Note: Within the category of envelopes of money given for auspicious occasions, envelopes of money given for celebrating a new home are known as shinchiku iwai, and envelopes of money given for a new baby are known as shussan iwai.) The giver inserts the money into a shūgi-bukuro on which they have written their name, and the amount of money inside. In the case of weddings, the shūgi-bukuro is handed to the receptionist of the reception party; otherwise, the money is collected by the person themselves, with the envelopes acting as a record of who gave money and how much they gave. Shūgi-bukuro are sold at supermarkets and stationery stores.

Shūgi-bukuro are a category of kinpū (金封, envelope of money), the general term for an envelope of money given on a special occasion. They are distinct from the category of envelopes of money given for funerals, known as fushūgibukuro or kōdenbukuro. Shūgi-bukuro were traditionally hand-made by the person giving the money, a practice that has now largely fallen out of fashion. The envelopes are typically decorated with mizuhiki cord, with the colour of the cord having significance for the occasion, or, in the case of a funeral, the religious denomination of the giver.

== Amount given ==
The amount given in shūgi-bukuro differs according to the givers' relationship to the couple, their social status and the style of venue. In the case of friends or company colleagues, the amount given is usually between ¥20,000 and ¥30,000. In the case of close friends or those in a senior position at the bride or bridegroom's company, ¥30,000 to ¥50,000 is common, and in the case of relatives, ¥50,000 to ¥100,000 is not unusual.

For married couples that attend the wedding, ¥50,000 would be common, as opposed to unmarried couples, where each person would give a separate amount of roughly ¥30,000 each.

It is common to give amounts in which the leading digits form an odd number, such as ¥10,000 or ¥30,000, in order to symbolize the fact that the newly married couple cannot be divided. When the leading digit forms an even number, as in ¥20,000, the amount is usually given in an odd number of bills (e.g. 1 × ¥10,000 and 2 × ¥5,000). Amounts in which the leading digit forms a multiple of 4, such as ¥40,000, are not typically used, as the number 4 in Japanese can be pronounced as shi, the same as the pronunciation of the Japanese word for "death". Likewise, multiples of 9 are avoided, as the pronunciation of this number - ku - is identical to the word for "suffering".

== See also ==
- Washi, Japanese paper, used to make shūgi-bukuro
- Mizuhiki, decorative cords wrapped around shūgi-bukuro
- Otoshidama, a traditional Japanese New Year's gift
- Kōden-bukuro, envelope for condolence money offered at Japanese funerals
- Red envelope, or Hóngbāo, the Chinese equivalent.
- Origami
- Origata
- Noshi
