= Plafond knot =

Knot type inspired by Chinese ceiling art

Plafond
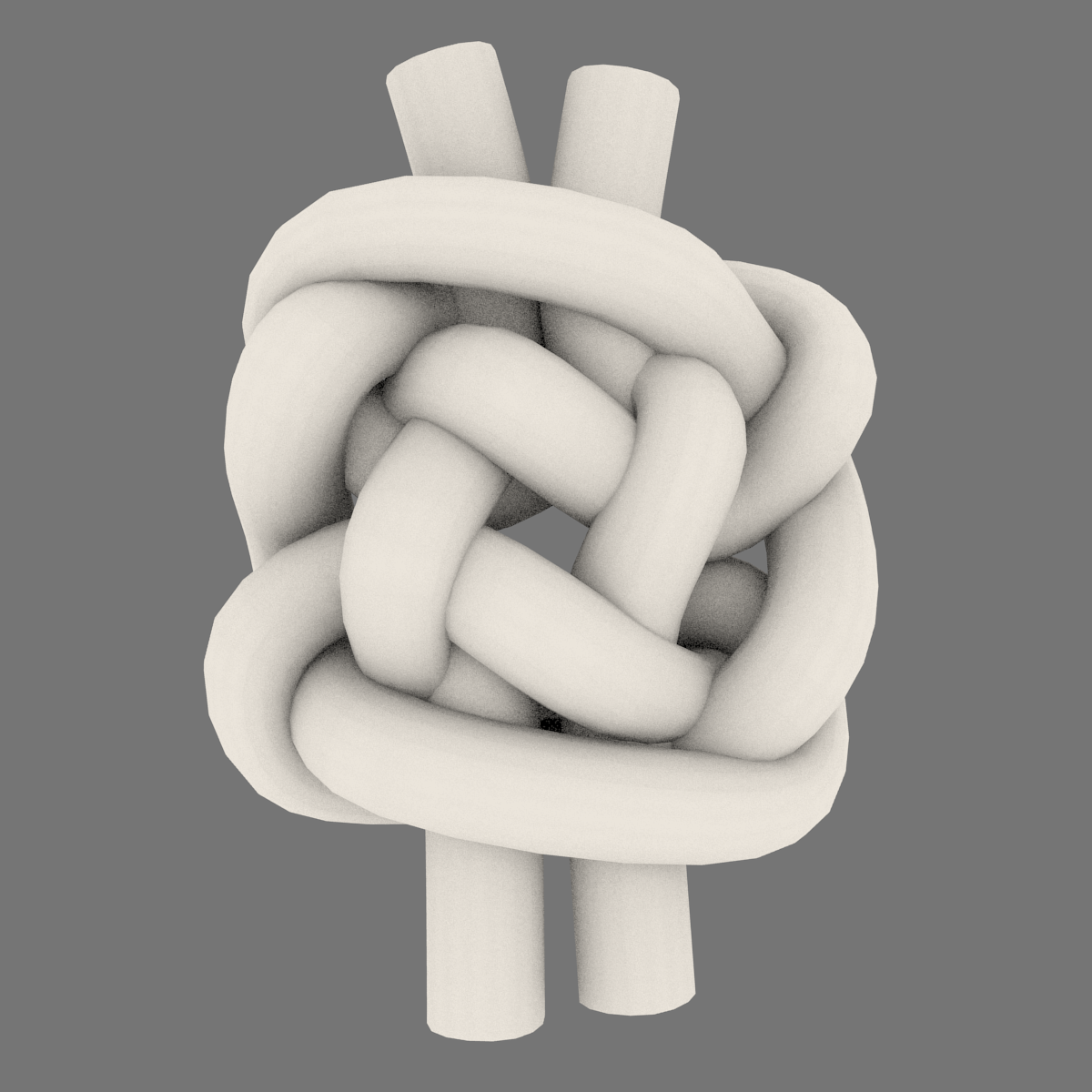
- Names: Plafond, Chinese Lanyard Knot, Китайский мусинг, lunette noeud, two-strand Chinese lanyard knot, Caisson Ceiling Knot
- Category: Decorative
- ABoK: 807

The Plafond knot, with its spiral-like center and rectangular border, was inspired by the decorations found on the dome-like central sections of ceilings in Chinese temples and palaces. The ceilings, which are divided into nine rectangular sections, three across and three deep, each have a domed apex composed of a circular design filled with auspicious motifs surrounded by a complementary motif which radiates out to the rectangular border. This effect is echoed in the plafond knot, which is made by hooking up and tightening a number of flat knots.

The knot is also known by other names:

name	source
藻井結, (simplified: 藻井结)	Chen 1.
藻井結	Ruri-Ishikawa
Spectacles Knot (안경매듭)	tUBoDk

== See also ==
- List of knots
- Chinese knotting
