= Red envelope =

Gift envelope containing cash

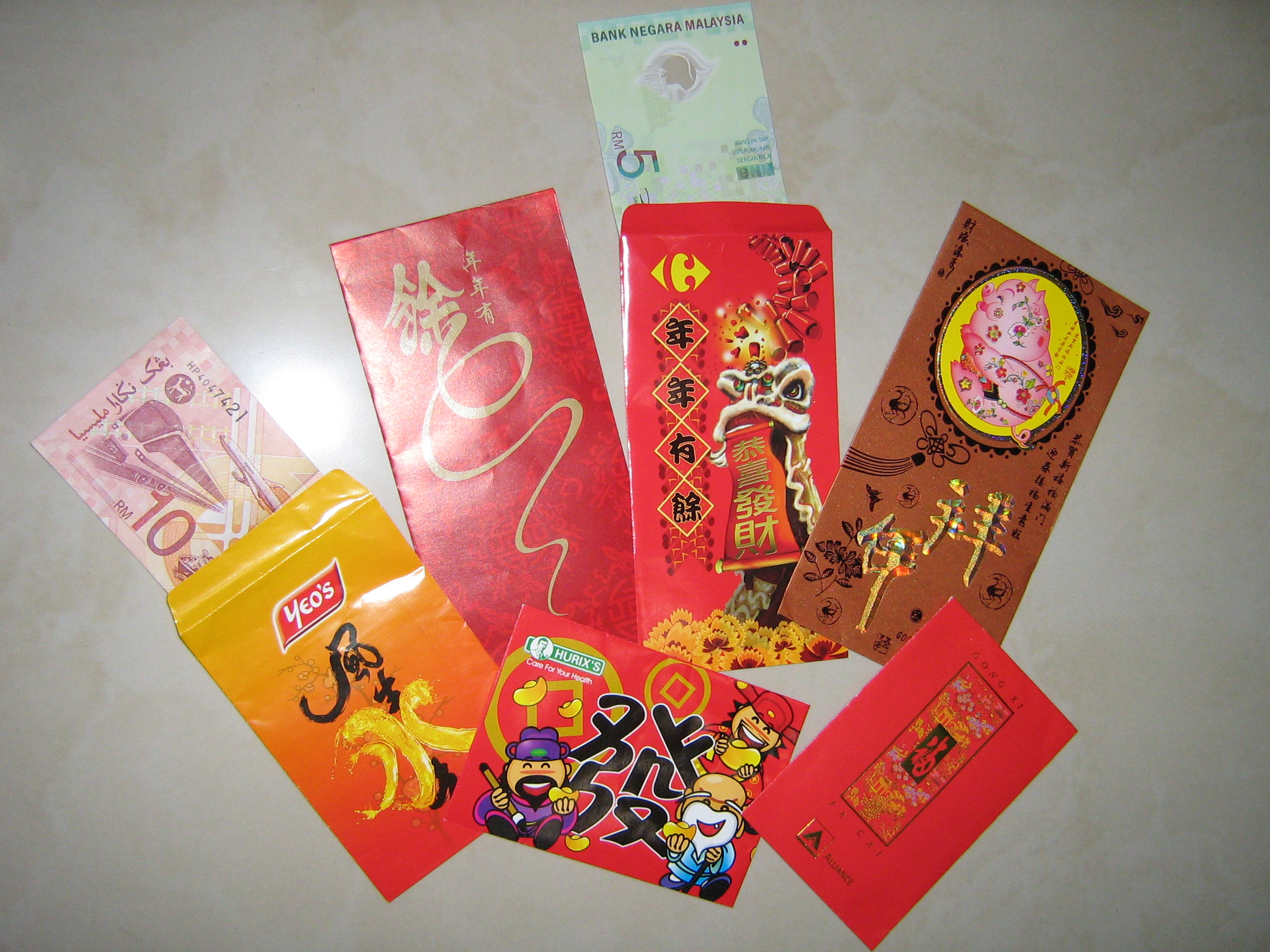
- Assorted examples of contemporary red envelopes

Chinese name
- Traditional Chinese: 紅包
- Simplified Chinese: 红包
- Literal meaning: "red packet"
Transcriptions
Standard Mandarin
- Hanyu Pinyin: hóngbāo
- IPA: [xʊ̌ŋ.páʊ]
Hakka
- Romanization: fung bao
Yue: Cantonese
- Yale Romanization: hùhngbāau
- Jyutping: hung4 baau1
Southern Min
- Hokkien POJ: âng-pau

Alternative Chinese name
- Chinese: 利是, 利市 or 利事
- Literal meaning: "good for business"
Transcriptions
Standard Mandarin
- Hanyu Pinyin: lìshì
- IPA: [lî.ʂî]
Hakka
- Romanization: li si
Yue: Cantonese
- Yale Romanization: làihsih
- Jyutping: lai6 si6
Southern Min
- Hokkien POJ: lī-chhī

Burmese name
- Burmese: အန်ပေါင်း an paung

Vietnamese name
- Vietnamese alphabet: lì xì mừng tuổi
- Hán-Nôm: 利市 𢜠歲

Thai name
- Thai: อั่งเปา
- RTGS: ang pow

Japanese name
- Kanji: お年玉袋 祝儀袋
Transcriptions
- Revised Hepburn: otoshidama-bukuro shūgi-bukuro

Malay name
- Malay: angpau

Filipino name
- Tagalog: angpao / ampaw

Khmer name
- Khmer: អាំងប៉ាវ ăngpav

A red envelope, red packet, red pocket, lai see (Chinese: 利是; Cantonese Yale: laih sih), hongbao or ang pau (traditional Chinese: 紅包; simplified Chinese: 红包; pinyin: hóngbāo; Pe̍h-ōe-jī: âng-pau) is a gift of money given during holidays or for special occasions such as weddings, graduations, and birthdays. It originated in China before spreading across parts of Southeast Asia and other countries with sizable ethnic Chinese populations.

In the mid-2010s, a digital equivalent to the practice emerged within messaging apps with mobile wallet systems localized for the Chinese New Year, particularly WeChat.

== History ==
The history of the red packet dates to the Han dynasty. People created a type of coin to ward off evil spirits, "yasheng qian" (Chinese: 压胜钱; pinyin: yāshèng qián), which was inscribed with auspicious words, such as "May you live a long and successful life". It was believed to protect people from sickness and death.

In the Tang dynasty, the Chinese New Year was seen as the beginning of spring, and in addition to congratulations, elders gave money to children to ward off evil spirits.

After the Song and Yuan dynasties, the custom of giving money in the Spring Festival evolved into the custom of giving children lucky money. The elderly would thread coins with a red string.

The Ming and Qing dynasties featured two kinds of lucky money. One was made of red string and coins, sometimes placed at the foot of the bed in the shape of a dragon. The other was a colorful pouch filled with coins.

In Qing dynasty, the name "yāsuì qián" (压岁钱) emerged. The book Qīng Jiā Lù (清嘉录) recorded that "elders give children coins threaded together by a red string, the money is called yasui qian."

From the Republic of China (1912–1949) era, it evolved into 100 coins wrapped in red paper, meaning "May you live a hundred years!". Due to the lack of holes in modern-day coins, red envelopes became more prevalent. Later, people adopted banknotes instead of coins.

After the founding of the People's Republic of China in 1949, the custom of the elders giving the younger generation money continued.

== Usage ==
Red envelopes containing cash, known as hongbao in Mandarin and laisee in Cantonese, are gifts presented at social and family gatherings such as weddings or holidays such as Chinese New Year; they are also gifted to guests as a gesture of hospitality. The red color of the envelope symbolizes good luck and wards off evil spirits. In Chinese, the red envelope is also called "money warding off old age" (壓歲錢; yāsuì qián) for Chinese New Year.

The act of requesting red packets is normally called tao hongbao (Chinese: 討紅包; pinyin: tǎo hóngbāo) or yao lishi (Chinese: 要利是; pinyin: yào lìshì), and, in the south of China, dou lishi (Chinese: 逗利是; pinyin: dòu lìshì; Cantonese Yale: dauh laih sih). Red envelopes are usually given out to the younger generation who are normally in school or unmarried.

The amount of money contained in the envelope usually ends with an even digit, following Chinese beliefs; odd-numbered money gifts are traditionally associated with funerals. An exception exists for the number nine, as the pronunciation of nine (Chinese: 九; pinyin: jiǔ) is homophonous to the word long (久; jiǔ), and is the largest single digit. In some regions of China and among the Chinese diaspora, odd numbers are favored for weddings because they are difficult to divide. One widespread tradition is that money should not be given in fours, or the number four should not appear in the amount, such as in 40, 400, and 444, as the pronunciation of the word four (四; sì) is similar to the word death (死; sǐ). When giving money, new bills are favored over old bills. It is common to see long bank queues before Chinese New Year holding people waiting to acquire new bills.

At wedding banquets, the amount offered is usually intended to cover the cost of the attendees as well as signify goodwill to the newlyweds. The amounts given are often recorded in ceremonial ledgers for the new couple to keep.

In southern China, red envelopes are typically given by the married to the unmarried during Chinese New Year, mostly to children. In northern and southern China, red envelopes are typically given by the elders to those under 25 (or 30 in most of the three northeastern provinces), regardless of marital status. The money is usually in the form of notes to make it difficult to judge the amount before opening. In Malaysia it is common to add a coin to the notes, particularly in hongbao given to children, signifying even more luck.

It is traditional to avoid opening the envelopes in front of the relatives out of courtesy. However, to receive an envelope, the youth kowtow to thank their elders. In Hong Kong, red envelopes are traditionally opened on or after the 7th day of the Lunar New Year.

During Chinese New Year supervisors or business owners give envelopes to employees.

In Suzhou, children keep the red envelope in their bedroom after receiving it. They believe that putting the red envelope under their bed can protect the children. This action relates to the Chinese "壓 yā". Those yasui qian would not be used until the end of Chinese New Year. They also receive fruit or cake during the celebration.

It is traditional to give an actor a red packet when he or she is to play a dead character, or pose for a picture for an obituary or a grave stone.

Red packets are also used to deliver payment for favorable service to lion dance performers, religious practitioners, teachers, and doctors.

Red packets as a form of bribery in China's film industry, were revealed in 2014's Sony hack.

In the Chinese communities of Singapore, Malaysia, Hong Kong and Macao, it is also customary for red packets to be given to service staff, such as security guards, cleaners, domestic helpers and doormen during the first few days of the Lunar New Year.

=== Virtual red envelopes ===
Chinese instant messaging and social networking platforms have offered a virtual version of red envelopes, also referred to as e-hongbao, via their mobile payment features, allowing users to similarly distribute gifts of money to contacts and groups. The practice was popularized by WeChat, which first introduced its red envelope feature via WeChat Pay during the Chinese New Year holiday in 2014. The launch included an on-air promotion during the CCTV New Year's Gala—China's most-watched television special—where viewers could win red envelopes as prizes. WeChat Pay adoption increased following the launch, and over 32 billion virtual envelopes were sent over the Chinese New Year holiday in 2016—a tenfold increase over 2015.

The feature's popularity spawned imitations from other vendors; a "red envelope war" emerged between WeChat owner Tencent and its historic rival, Alibaba Group, who added a similar function to its payment service, and outbid Tencent to hold a similar promotion during the CCTV Gala in 2016. Analysts estimated that over 100 billion digital red envelopes would be sent over the New Year holiday in 2017. In 2019, WeChat added the ability for the virtual packets to be customized with covers created by brands, which can also link to and integrate with their respective WeChat presences (such as Mini Programs). This feature would be utilized as a form of seasonal marketing and viral engagement.

One study reported that this popularization of virtual red packets comes from their contagious feature, as users who receive red packets feel obligated to follow.

In January 2022, the American mobile payments service Venmo introduced a similar feature called "gift-wrapping", which similarly allows sent money to be concealed and decorated with a themed animation (which, at launch, included several Chinese New Year-themed animations). Venmo parent company PayPal cited increases in use of the red envelope emoji (🧧) by users around the Chinese New Year.

== Other customs ==
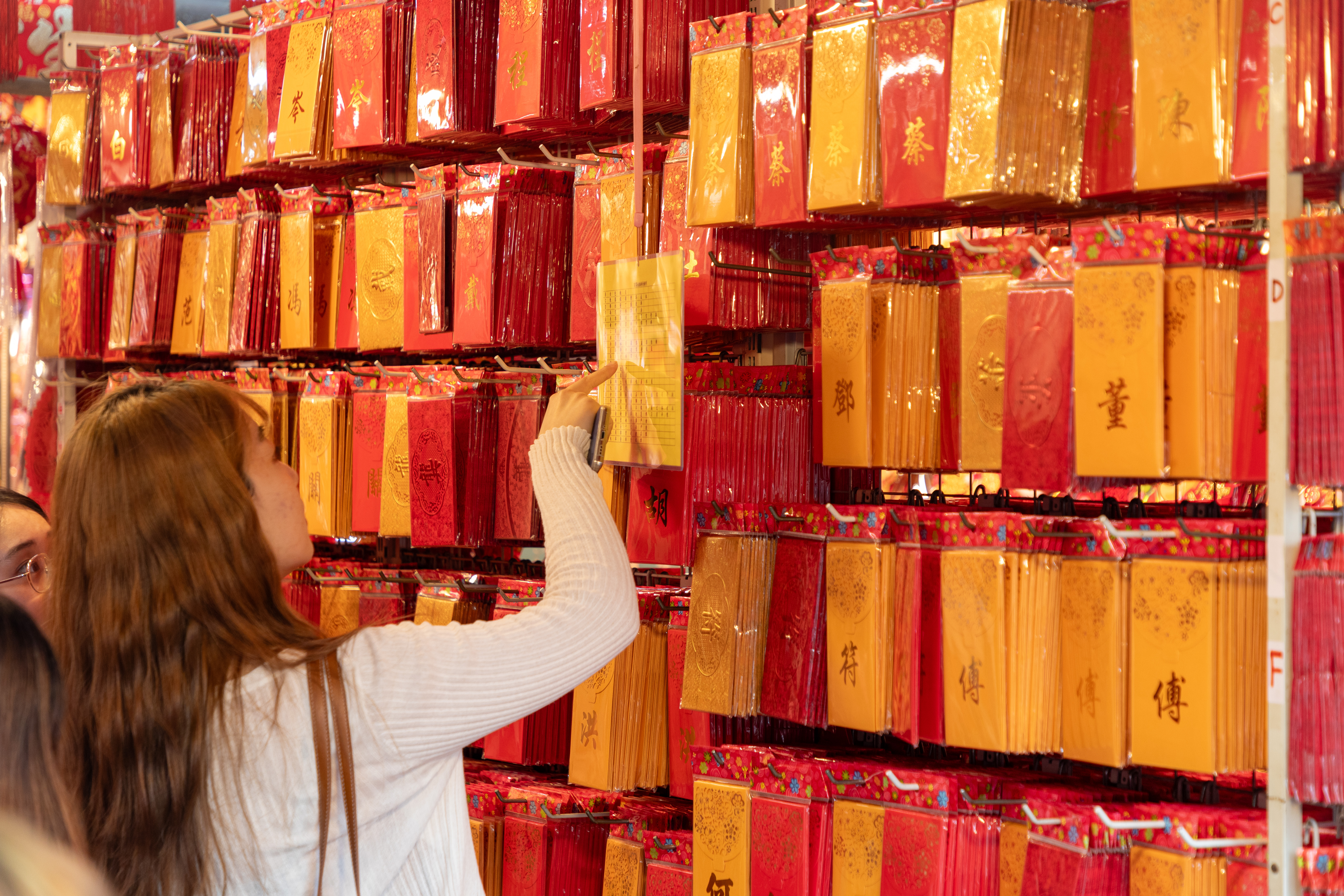
Girls in Singapore selecting red envelopes for Chinese New Year

Other similar traditions also exist in other countries in Asia.

=== Ethnic Chinese ===
In Thailand, Myanmar (Burma), and Cambodia, the Chinese diaspora and immigrants introduced the practice of red envelopes.

=== Cambodia ===
In Cambodia, red envelopes are called ang pav or tae ea ("give ang pav"). Ang pav are delivered with best wishes to younger generations. Ang pav is an important gift as a symbol of good luck from the elders. Ang pav can be presented on the day of Chinese New Year or Saen Chen, when relatives gather. The gift is kept as a worship item in or under the pillowcase, or somewhere else, especially near the bed of young while they are sleeping. Ang pav can be either money or a cheque, and more or less according to the donors.

Ang pav are not given to someone in family who has a career, while such a person has to gift their parents and/or their younger children or siblings.

At weddings, the amount offered is scaled to cover the cost of the attendees as well as help the newlyweds.

=== Vietnam ===
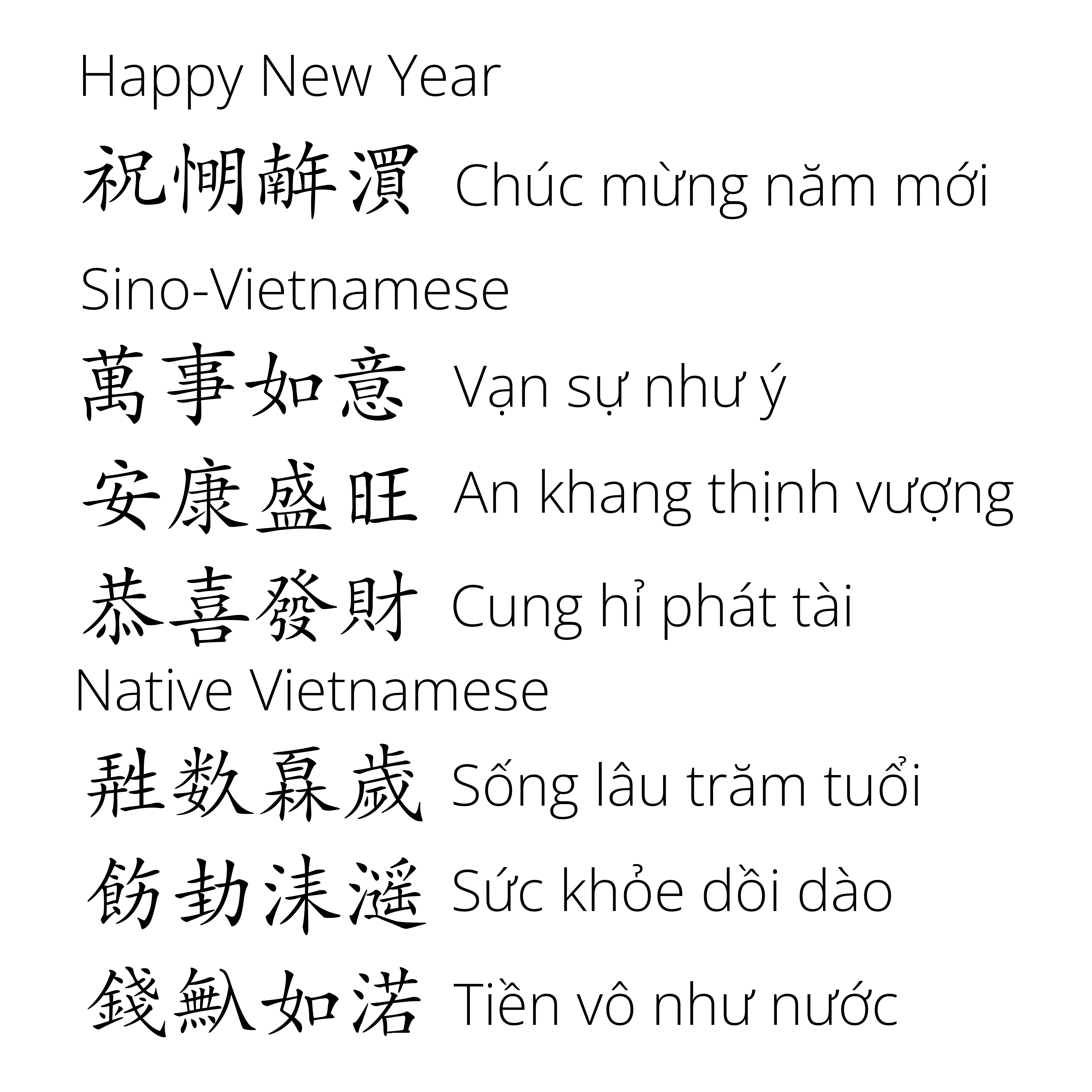
Tết greetings shown in the Vietnamese alphabet, chữ Hán and chữ Nôm

Red envelopes are a traditional part of Vietnamese culture. They are considered to be lucky money and are typically given to children during Vietnamese New Year. They are generally given by elders and adults, where a greeting or offering health and longevity is exchanged. Common greetings include "Sống lâu trăm tuổi" ( 𤯩𥹰𤾓歲), "An khang thịnh vượng" (安康興旺), "Vạn sự như ý" (萬事如意) and "Sức khỏe dồi dào" ( 飭劸洡𤁠), wishing health and prosperity. The typical name for lucky money is lì xì (利市) or, less commonly, mừng tuổi ( 𢜠歲).

=== South Korea ===
In South Korea, a monetary gift is given to children by their relatives during the New Year period. Bags known as bokjumeoni (복주머니) are used instead of red envelopes.

=== Japan ===
Monetary gifts called otoshidama (お年玉) are given to children during the New Year period. White or decorated envelopes (お年玉袋, otoshidama-bukuro) are used instead of red, with the name of the receiver usually written on the front. A similar practice, shūgi-bukuro (祝儀袋), is observed for Japanese weddings, but the envelope is folded rather than sealed, and decorated with an elaborate bow, called mizuhiki (水引).

=== Philippines ===
In the Philippines, Chinese Filipinos (known locally as "Filipino-Chinese") exchange red envelopes (termed ang pao) during the Lunar New Year or "Chinese New Year". Red envelopes have gained acceptance in the broader Philippine society. Filipinos with no Chinese heritage appropriated the custom for occasions such as birthdays and in giving monetary aguinaldo during Christmas and New Year. Due to the phonetics of most Philippine languages, red envelopes are nowadays more well known as ampaw.

=== Green envelope ===
Malay Muslims in Malaysia, Brunei, Indonesia, and Singapore adopted the Chinese custom as part of their Eid al-Fitr (Malay: Hari Raya Aidilfitri) celebrations, but instead of red packets other colored envelopes are used, most commonly green. Customarily a family gives a generally small amount of money in a green envelope, and may send it to friends and family unable to visit. Green is used for its traditional association with Islam. The adaptation of the red envelope is based on the Muslim custom of sadaqah, or voluntary charity. While present in the Qur'an, sadaqah is less formally established than the sometimes similar practice of zakat, and in many cultures this takes a form closer to gift-giving and generosity among friends than charity. I.e. no attempt is made to give more to guests "in need", nor is it a religious obligation. Among the Sundanese people, a boy who had been recently circumcised is given monetary gifts known as panyecep or uang sunatan.

=== Purple envelope ===
The tradition of ang pao was adopted by local Indian Hindu populations of Singapore and Malaysia for Deepavali. They are known as Deepavali ang pow (in Malaysia), purple ang pow or simply ang pow (in Singapore). Yellow colored envelopes for Deepavali were given in the past.

== See also ==
- Chinese marriage
- Chinese social relations
- Color in Chinese culture
- Eidiyah
- Gift economy
- Hell money

== Sources ==
- Chengan Sun, "Les enveloppes rouges : évolution et permanence des thèmes d'une image populaire chinoise" [Red envelopes : evolution and permanence of the themes of a Chinese popular image], PhD, Paris, 2011.
- Chengan Sun, Les enveloppes rouges (Le Moulin de l'Etoile, 2011) ISBN 978-2-915428-37-7.
- Helen Wang, "Cultural Revolution Style Red Packets", Chinese Money Matters, 15 May 2018.
