= Lào zi =

Knotting craft in ancient China also used as clothing decoration

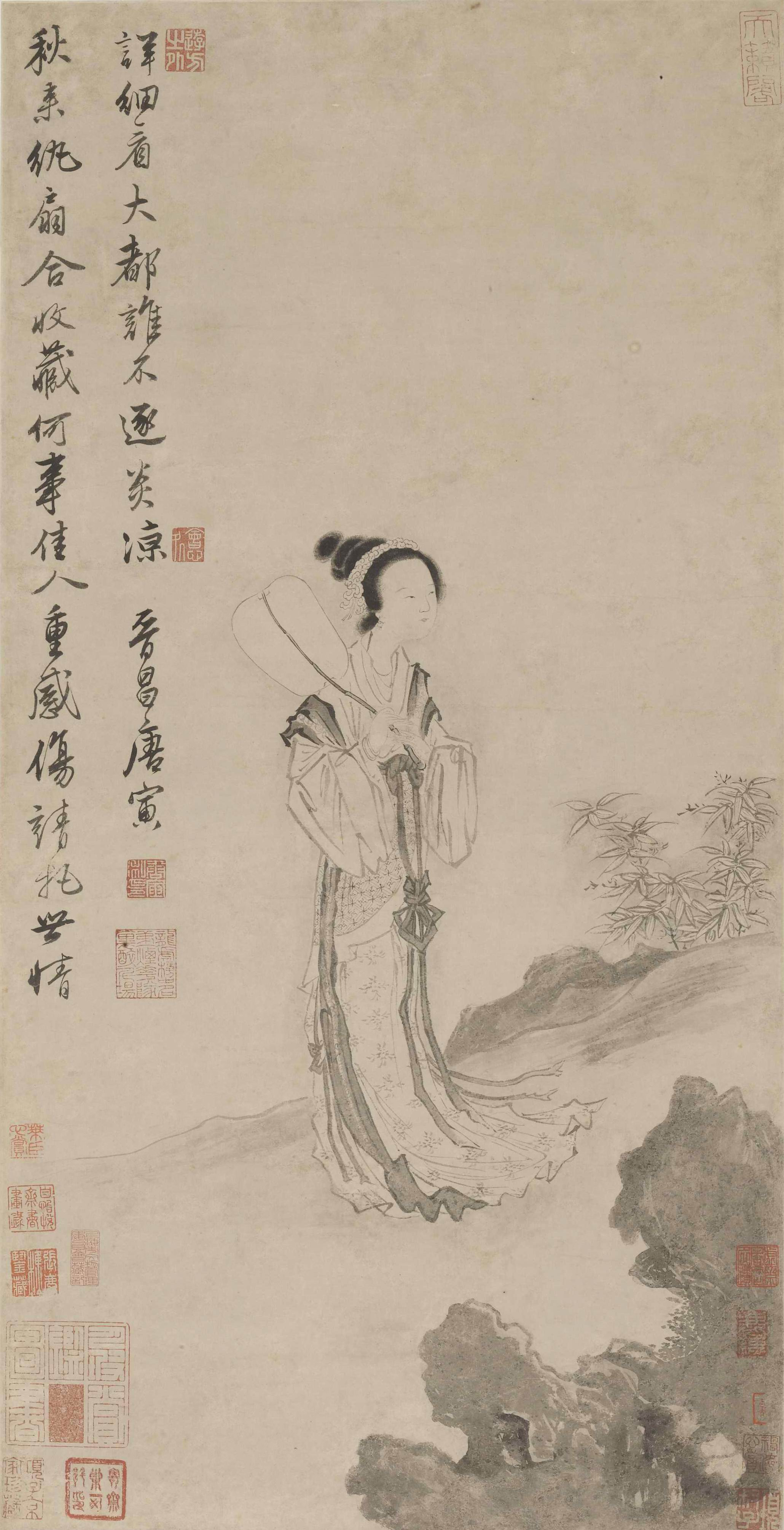
- Lào or tāo (knotted ribbons) used as a form of Hanfu accessories; it is tied at the waist belt of a ruqun

Chinese name
- Traditional Chinese: 絡子
- Simplified Chinese: 络子
Transcriptions
Standard Mandarin
- Hanyu Pinyin: Làozi

Tāo zi
- Chinese: 绦子
Transcriptions
Standard Mandarin
- Hanyu Pinyin: Tāozi

English name
- English: Chinese knotting

Lào zi (simplified Chinese: 络子; traditional Chinese: 絡子), also called Tāo zi (绦子), is an ancient name for knots in China. In ancient Chinese literature, the Lào zi actually refers to what is now known as zhongguo jie (simplified Chinese: 中国结; traditional Chinese: 中國結; Hanyu Pinyin: zhōngguó jié; Tongyong Pinyin: li; lit. 'Chinese knots') in Chinese and Chinese knotting in English. The term Chinese knotting only became known in recent years when it was summarized by Lydia Chen in the 1980s. It was a tradition to use the lào and/or tāo as a form of yaopei ("waist girdle ornament") in Hanfu where it was tied to the waist by using silk or cotton ribbon.

== Etymology ==
The meaning of the two terms Lào zi and Tāo zi are quite similar.

The Chinese character for lào (络; 絡) refers to knotting, enmeshing, and wrapping. The Chinese character for tāo (绦) refers to the lace or flat ribbon woven from silk thread which can used to decorate clothing.

== Usage ==
According to Dream of the Red Chamber, making Lào zi means making knots that can be used on waist as knotting belt; the Lào zi could also be as decorative knots with tassel hanging for small object or furnishing (similar to the norigae used in the hanbok). As a form of knot-craft, it could be used to knot a net sachet for containing small objects.

The knot at the waist by ribbon can be seen from many artworks especially in the beauty painting, and ancient literature description recorded that the tradition of knot ribbon can be traced back to the Spring and Autumn period (770 – 76 BCE); for example, in the chapter Zhaogong (昭公) of the Zuo Zhuan (左傳), the tradition of tying ribbon as knots to the belt is recorded.

== Gallery ==
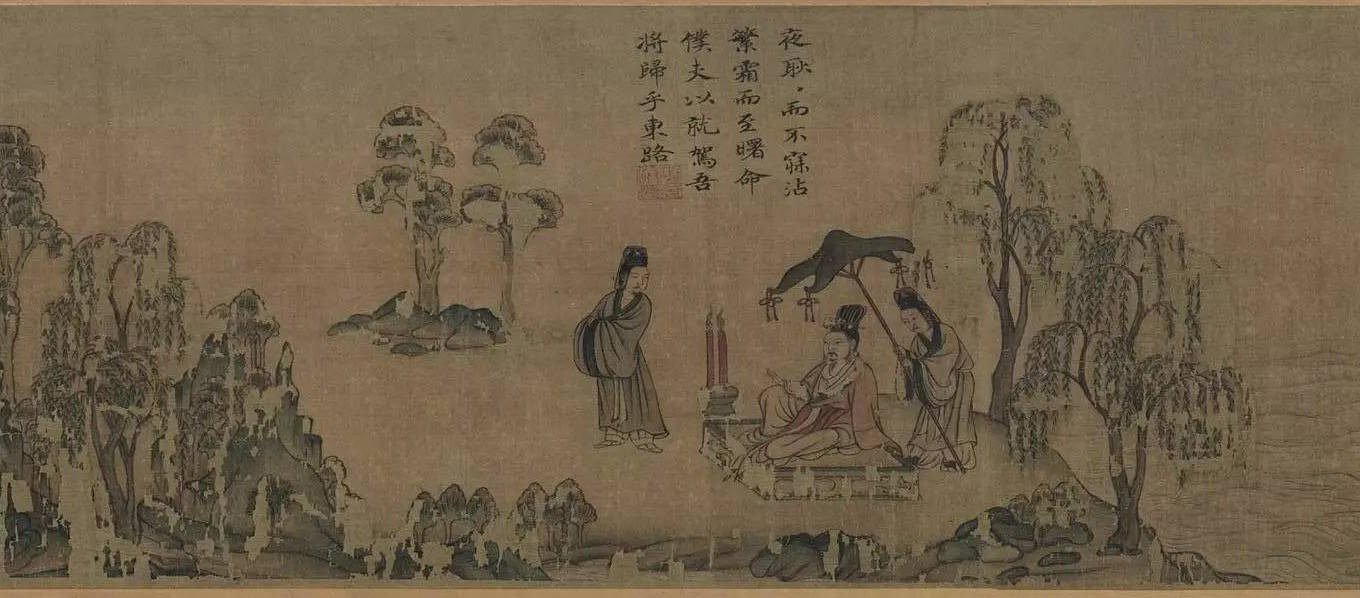

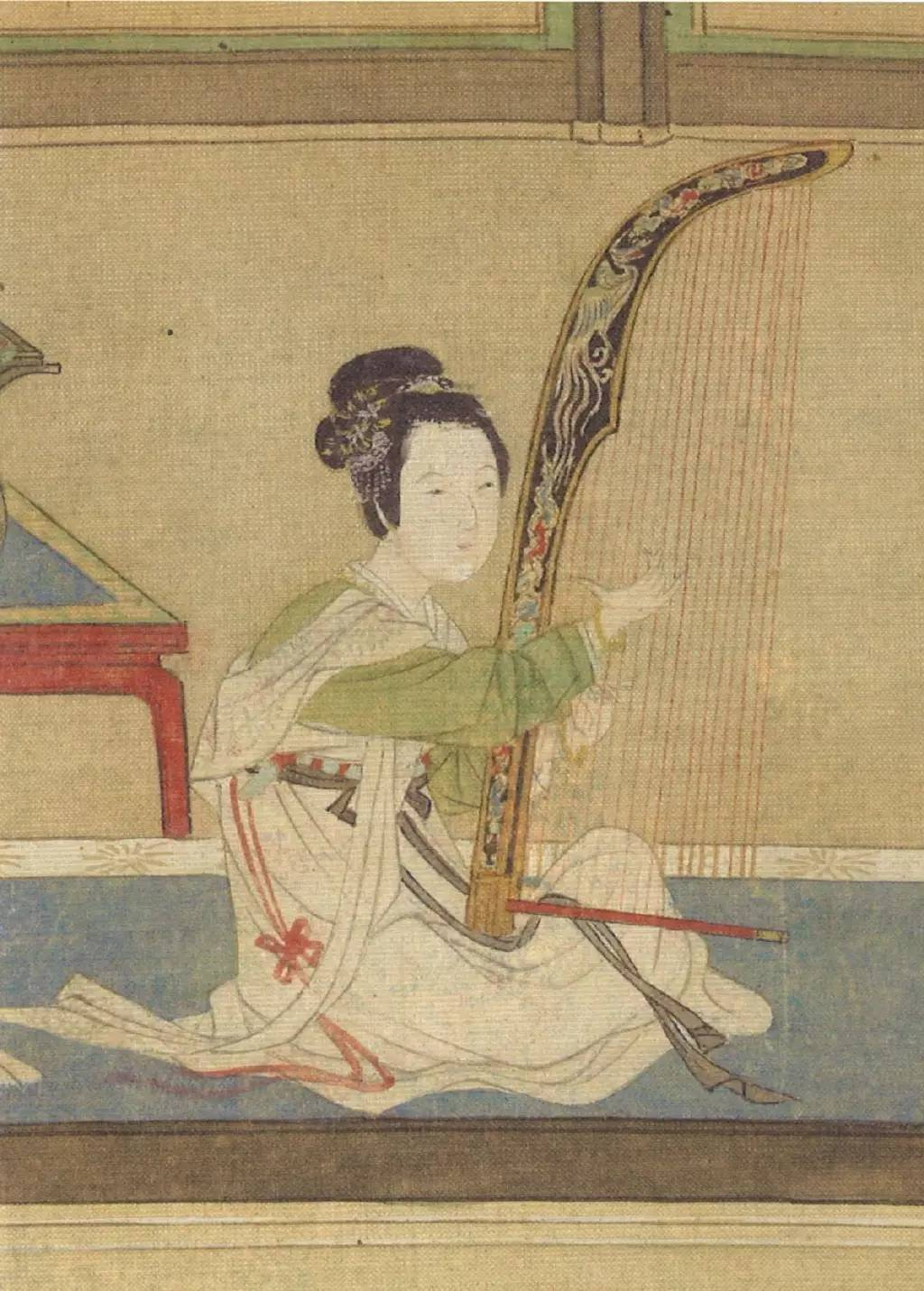

== See also ==
- Chinese knotting
- Frog (fastening) – a fastener which originated from China and is now typically used in cheongsam
- Hanfu accessories
- Hanfu
