= Good luck knot =

Chinese rope knot

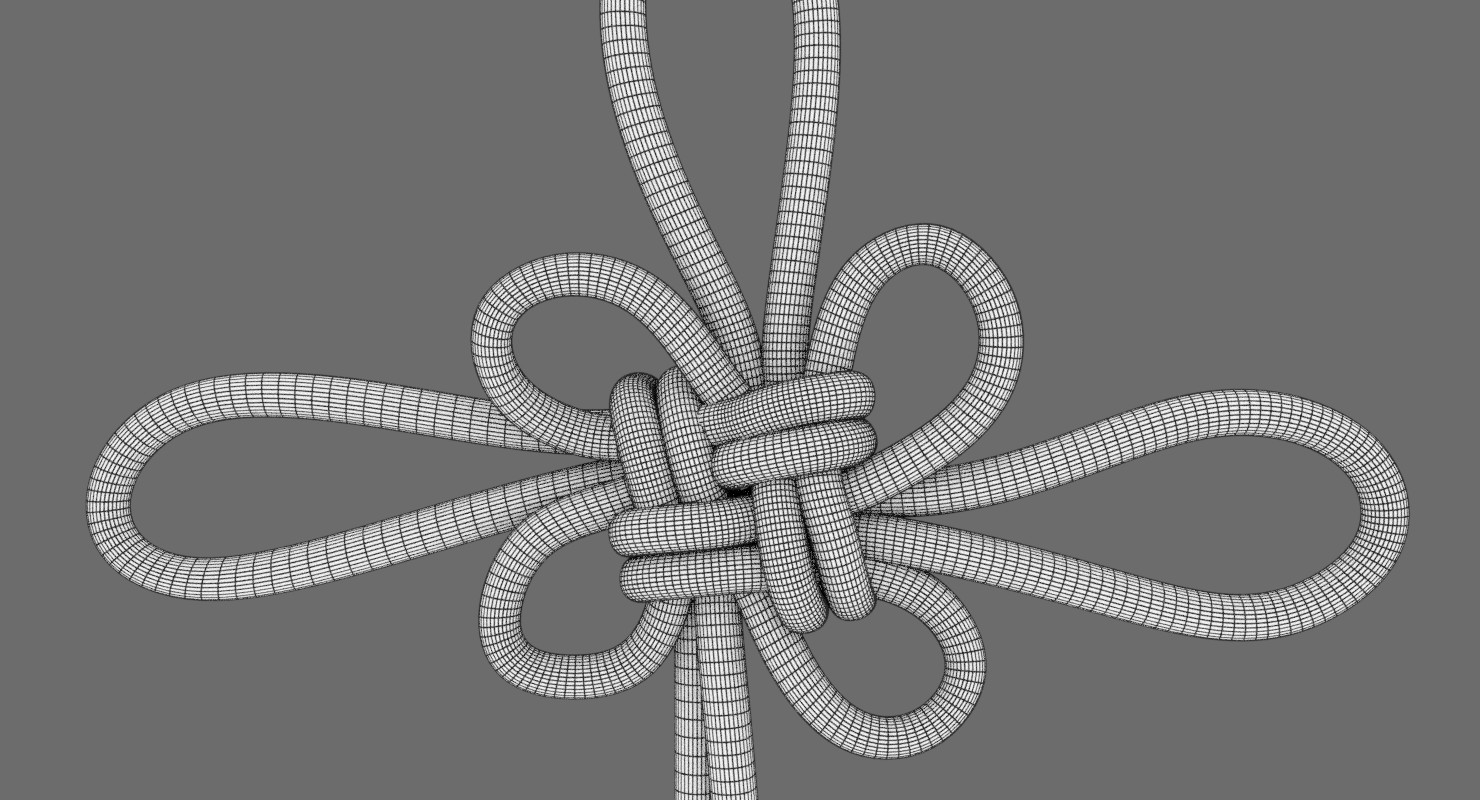
- Names: Good luck knot, Shamrock knot
- Category: Decorative
- ABoK: 2436

The Good luck knot (Note: 吉祥結), also known as the Chrysanthemum Knot (Note: 菊結び) and One Mind Knot (Note: 동심결매듭), can be seen in images carved on a statue of the East Asian Goddess of Mercy, Guanyin, which was created between AD 557 and 588, and later found in a cave in northwest China.

== See also ==
- List of knots
- Chinese knotting
