= Endless knot =

Decorative knot

- A common form of the endless knot

Chinese name
- Traditional Chinese: 盤長結
- Simplified Chinese: 盘长结
Transcriptions
Standard Mandarin
- Hanyu Pinyin: pánzhǎng jié

Tibetan name
- Tibetan: དཔལ་བེའུ།
Transcriptions
- Wylie: dpal be'u

Mongolian name
- Mongolian Cyrillic: түмэн өлзий

Japanese name
- Kanji: 盤長結
Transcriptions
- Romanization: Banchōmusubi

Sanskrit name
- Sanskrit: श्रीवत्स

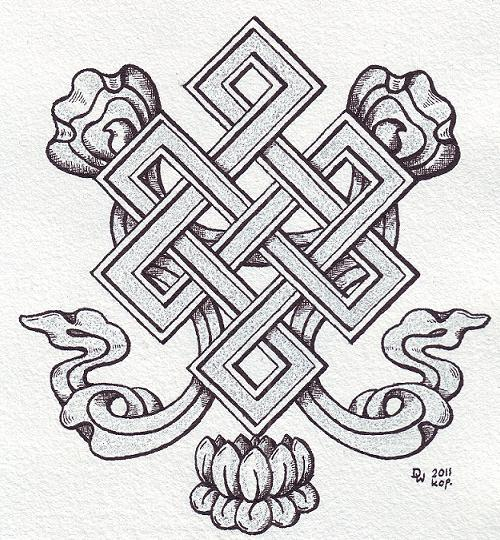
More decorative form of the endless knot

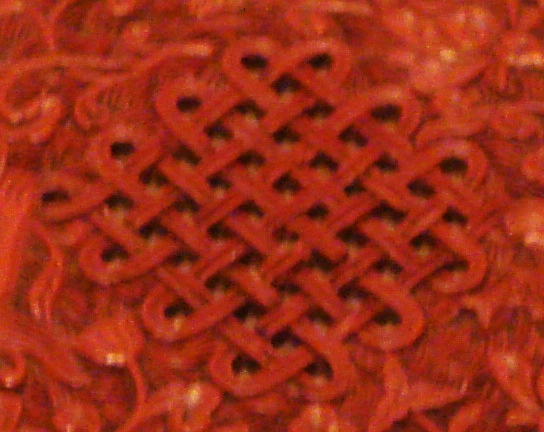
More complex form of the endless knot is seen on a c. 400-year-old Chinese lacquerware dish

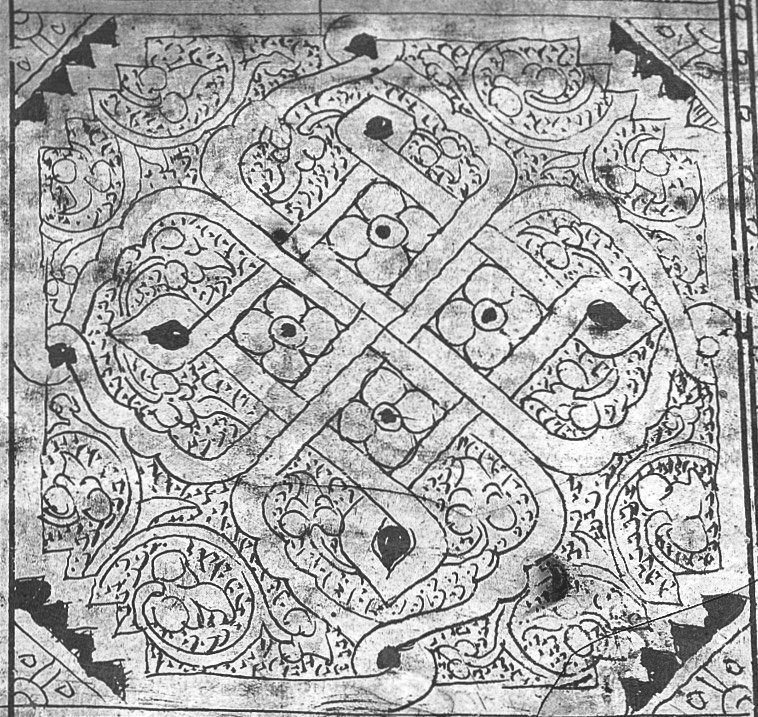
Endless knot in a Burmese Pali manuscript

In Hinduism, Jainism and Buddhism, the endless knot or eternal knot is a symbolic knot and one of the Eight Auspicious Symbols. It is an important cultural marker in places significantly influenced by Tibetan Buddhism such as Tibet, Mongolia, Tuva, Kalmykia, and Buryatia. It is also found in Celtic, Kazakh and Chinese symbolism.

== History ==
The endless knot appears on clay tablets from the Indus Valley civilization (2500 BC) and on a historic era inscription. While associated with Dharmic religions, it also appears in Islamic art. It likely was introduced due to trade and other cultural contact with China, the Mongols, and Iran.

== Interpretations ==
=== Buddhism ===
Various Buddhist interpretations of the symbol are:

- The endless knot iconography symbolised Samsara i.e., the endless cycle of suffering of birth, death and rebirth within Tibetan Buddhism.
- The inter-twining of wisdom and compassion.
- Interplay and interaction of the opposing forces in the dualistic world of manifestation, leading to their union, and ultimately to harmony in the universe.
- The mutual dependence of religious doctrine and secular affairs.
- The union of wisdom and method.
- The inseparability of emptiness (shunyata) and dependent origination, the underlying reality of existence.
- The link between ancestors and omnipresence represented by the etymology of Tantra, Yoga and religion) (see Namkha.)
- The wisdom of the Buddha as neither are said to have a beginning or end.

=== Hinduism ===
In Hinduism, Srivatsa is mentioned as 'connected to shree', i.e the goddess Lakshmi. It is a mark on the chest of Vishnu where his consort Lakshmi resides. According to the Vishnu purana, the tenth avatar of Vishnu, Kalki, will bear the Shrivatsa mark on his chest. It is one of the names of Vishnu in the Vishnu Sahasranamam. Srivatsa is considered to be auspicious symbol in Andhra Pradesh, Telangana, Tamil Nadu and Karnataka.

=== Jainism ===
In Jainism it is one of the eight auspicious items, an asthamangala, however found only in the Svetambara sect. It is often found marking the chests of the 24 tirthankaras. It is more commonly referred to as the Shrivatsa.

== Logo ==
A stylized version of the endless knot is the logo of the Chinese state-owned telecommunications operator China Unicom.

== See also ==
- 7_{4} knot
- Celtic knot
- Chinese knotting
- Eternal return
- Indra's net
- Islamic interlace patterns
- Mandala
- Möbius strip
- Namkha
- Oseberg style
- Ouroboros
- Pan Chang knot
- Solomon's knot
- Trefoil knot
- Triquetra
- Valknut
- Yin and yang
