= Noshi =

Type of ceremonial origami

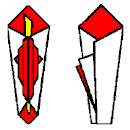
Traditional Japanese noshi

Noshi (熨斗) are a kind of ceremonial origami, folded distinctly from "origami-tsuki". They serve as gifts that express "good wishes". Noshi consists of white paper folded with a strip of dried abalone or meat, considered a token of good fortune and longevity.

== See also ==
- Shūgi-bukuro
