= Genda Shigyō =

Japanese paper production company

Genta Shigyō
- Native name: 源田紙業
- Company type: Kabushiki gaisha
- Industry: Pulp and paper
- Predecessor: Zenro Genda
- Founded: 771
- Headquarters: Japan, 〒602-8066 Kyoto, Kamigyo Ward, Higashihashizumecho, 76-1, Kamigyo-ku, Kyoto, Japan
- Website: www.shinise.ne.jp/j_kyoto/voices/vol/48/48-d.html

Genda Shigyō (Japanese: 源田紙業株式会社, romanized: Genda Shigyō Kabushiki gaisha) is a Japanese paper production company which has produced ceremonial paper goods such as mizuhiki, gift wrapping and betrothal gifts since 771. It is often known as one of the oldest still-operating companies in the world.

== History ==
Genda Shigyō is said to have been founded in 771 (Hōki 2) during the Nara period (710-794). With the relocation of the capital to Kyoto, the business moved as well. In the late Edo period, the Genda family took over the business of Zenbei Yagi and established Yagi Zen Genda Shoten. During the Meiji period, until mizuhiki became widespread among the general public, the company’s mizuhiki was supplied exclusively to the Imperial Court. In 1986 (Shōwa 61), Genda Paper Industry Co., Ltd. was established. Up until the prewar era, mizuhiki production was carried out at the current location. Today, the company handles products made with mizuhiki, ceremonial items such as betrothal gifts, and the wholesale and printing of various other paper products. As of 2024, the company still existed, although they do not do business anymore.

== See also ==
- Japanese craft
- List of oldest companies
- List of Traditional Crafts of Japan
