= Pan Chang knot =

Buddhist symbol

Pan chang
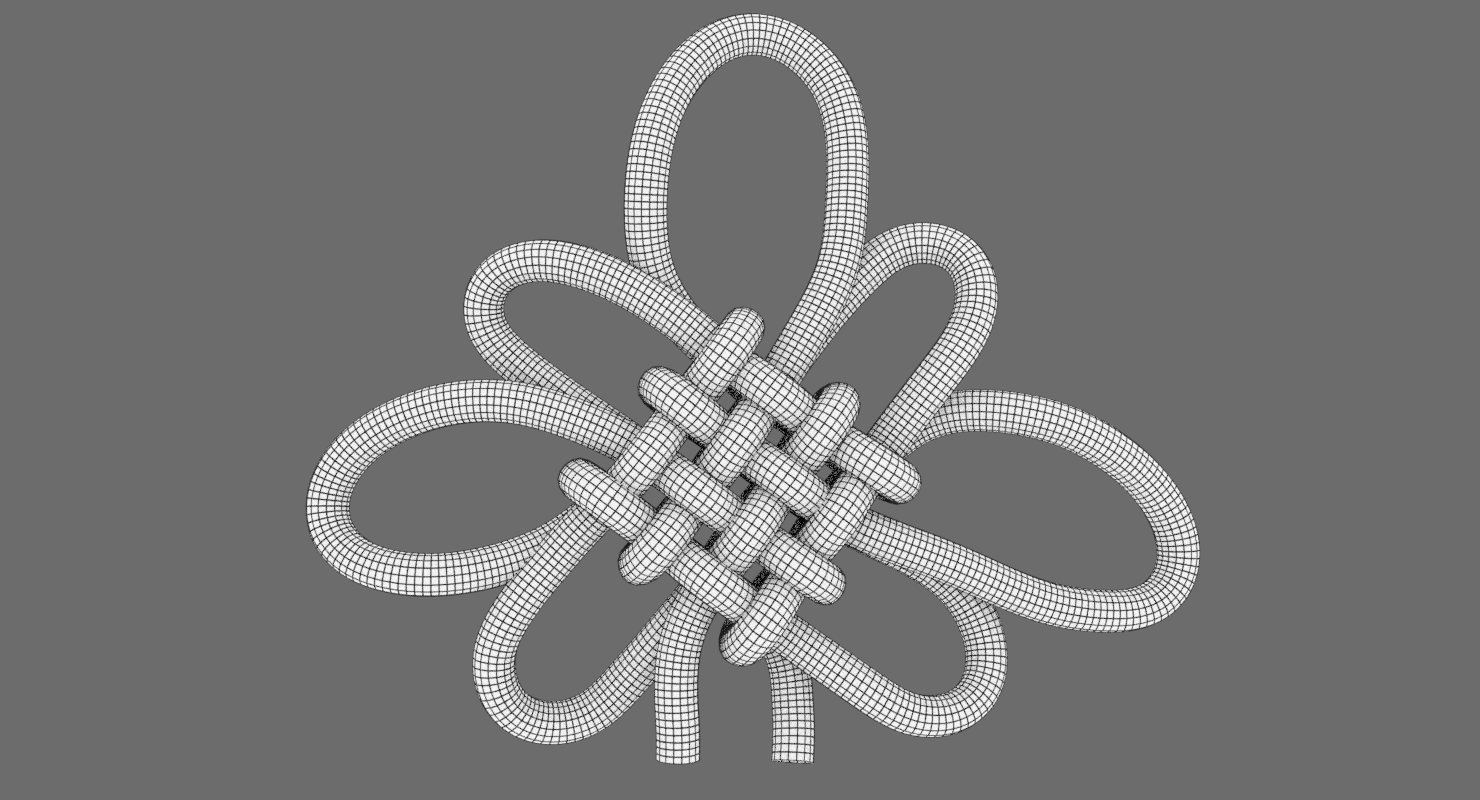
- Names: Pan chang, P'anch'ang pattern, 盤長結, chinese butterfly knot, Mystic knot, Мистический узел
- Category: Decorative
- ABoK: 2460

The Pan Chang Knot is one of the eight symbols of Buddhism. It communicates that religion's belief in a cycle of life with no beginning and no end. It was illustrated in a painting of the Emperor Xiaozhong (the second ruling member of the southern Song dynasty, which existed from AD 960 to 1279) that is now in the Palace Museum in Beijing. The knot is also known as the Mystic Knot, and is believed to impart good fortune to those who wear and observe it. It is an intricate knot that forces the tyer to think in three dimensions.

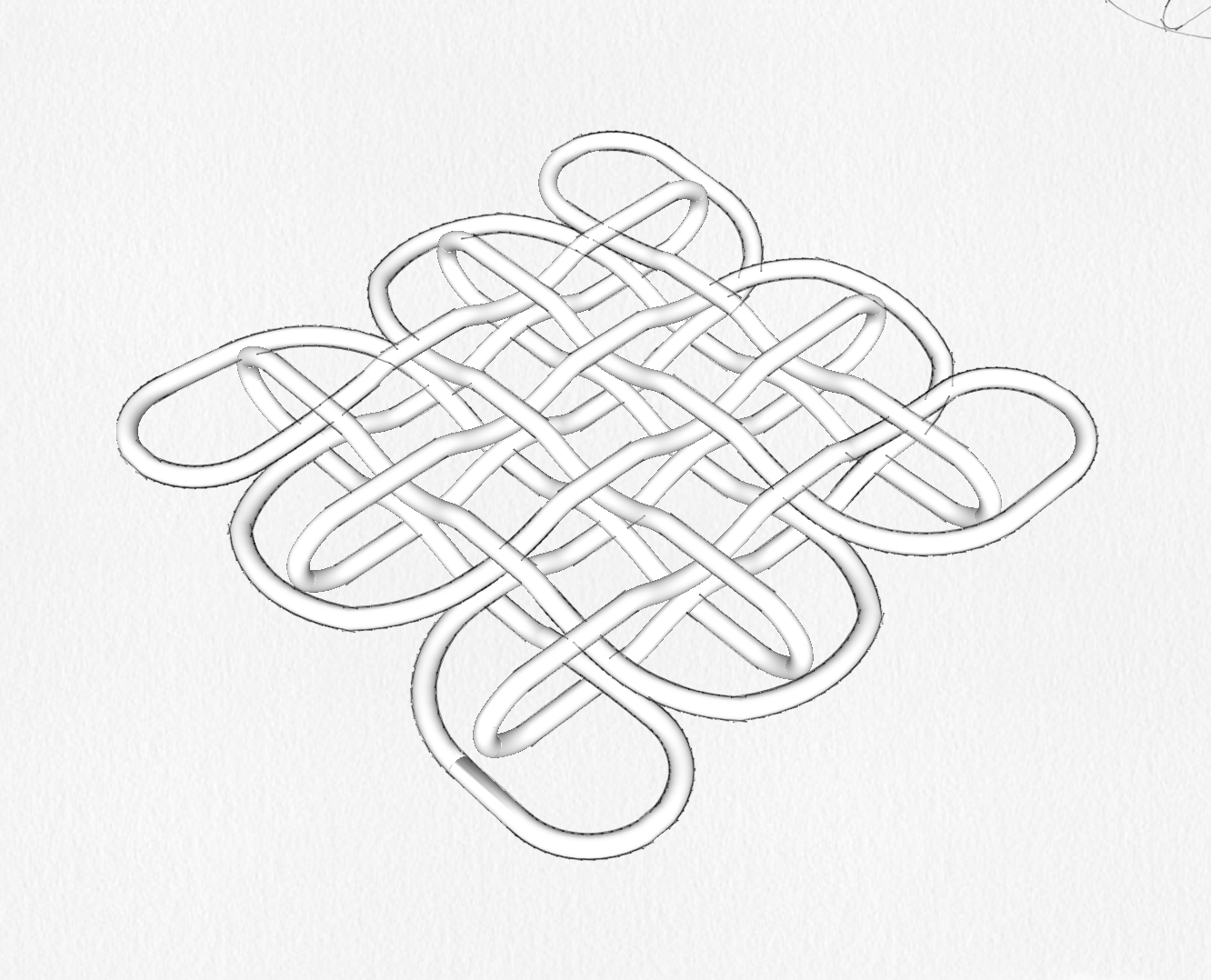
3d structure of Panchang knot

== See also ==
- List of knots
- Chinese knotting
- Endless knot
