= Macramé =

Technique of knotting cords or thick yarns to make lace or fringe

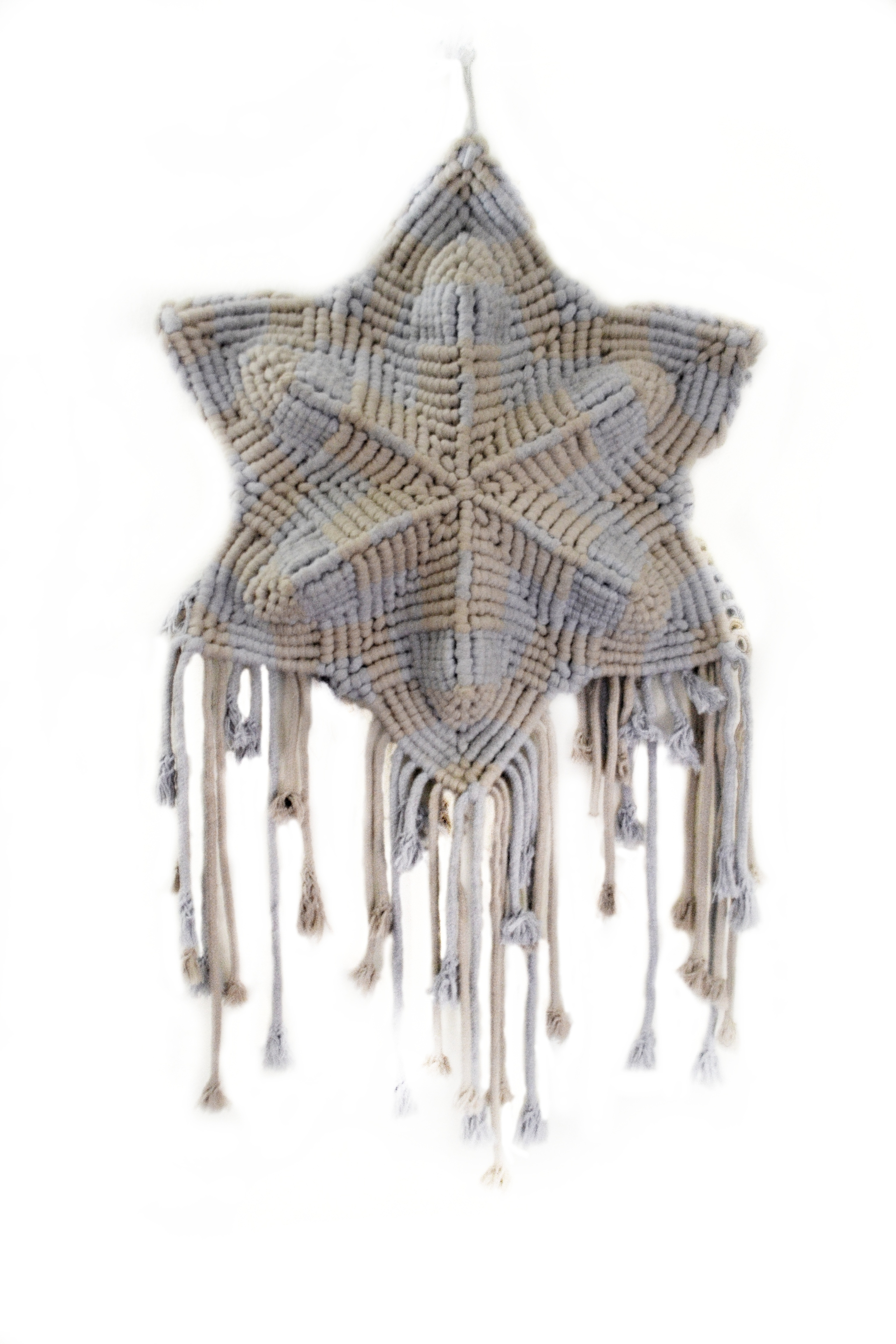
Detail of Cavandoli macramé

Macramé is a form of textile produced using knotting (rather than weaving or knitting) techniques.

The primary knots of macramé are the square (or reef knot) and forms of "hitching": various combinations of half hitches. It was long crafted by sailors, especially in elaborate or ornamental knotting forms, to cover anything from knife handles to bottles to parts of ships.

Cavandoli macramé is one variety that is used to form geometric and free-form patterns like weaving. The Cavandoli style is done mainly in a single knot, the double half-hitch knot. Reverse half hitches are sometimes used to maintain balance when working the left and right halves of a balanced piece.

Leather or fabric belts are another accessory often created via macramé techniques. Most friendship bracelets exchanged among schoolchildren and teens are created using this method. Vendors at theme parks, malls, seasonal fairs, and other public places may sell macramé jewelry or decoration as well.

== History ==
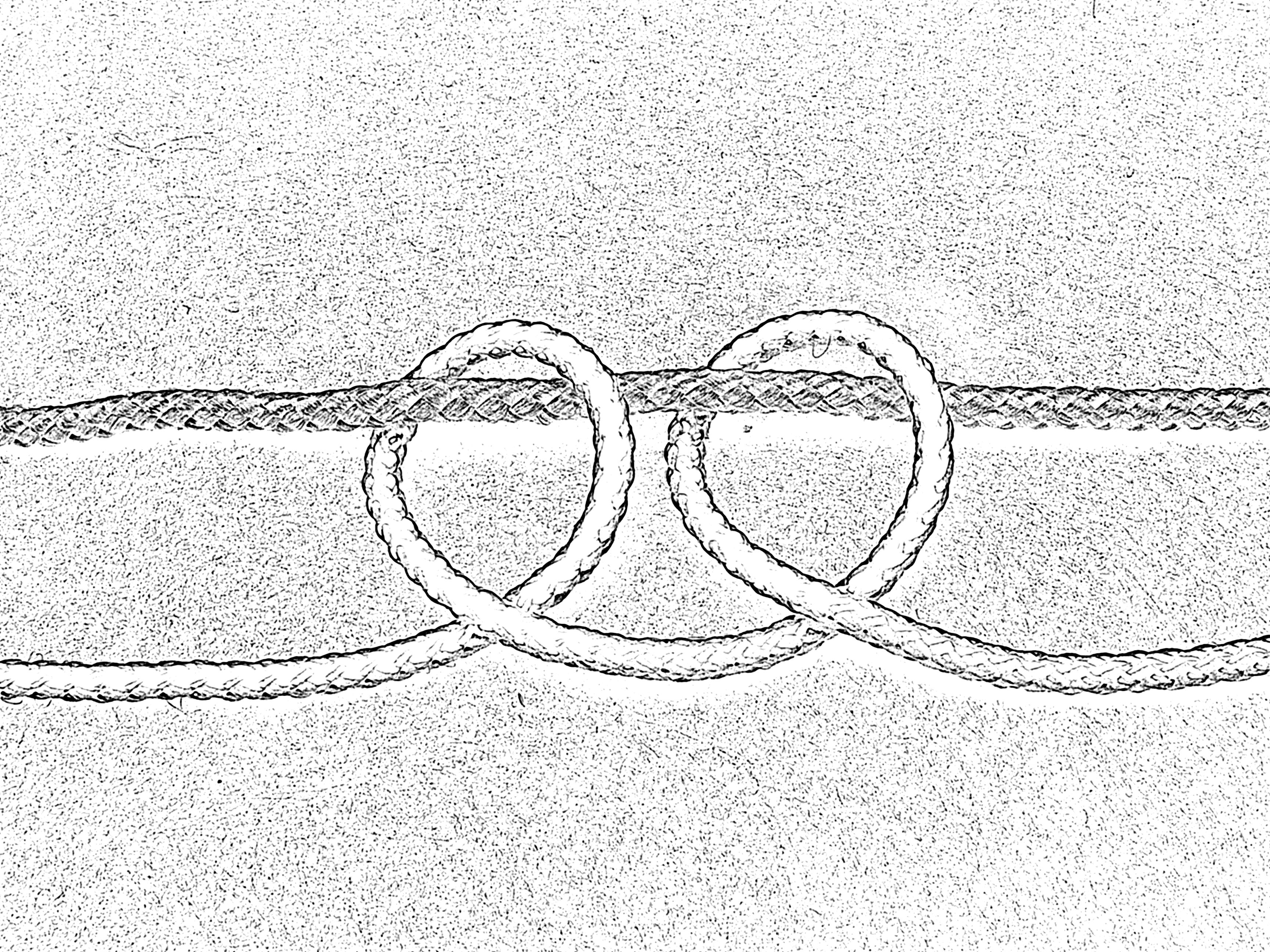
Macramé knot: clove hitch with loops up

One of the earliest recorded uses of macramé-style knots as decoration appeared in the carvings of the Babylonians and Assyrians. Fringe-like plaiting and braiding adorned the costumes of the time and were captured in their stone statuary.

Arab weavers called this kind of decorated cloth embroidery miqrama (مِقْرَمة). It involved knotting excess thread along the edges of hand-loomed fabrics such as towels, shawls, and veils into decorative fringes. The word macramé could be derived from the Andalusian-Arabic version makramiyya (مكرمية), believed to mean "striped towel", "ornamental fringe" or "embroidered veil". Another school of thought indicates that it came to Europe not from Arabic but via the Turkish version makrama, "napkin" or "towel". The decorative fringes also helped to keep flies off camels and horses in northern Africa.

The Muslim conquest of the Iberian Peninsula took the craft to Spain, then Italy, especially in the region of Liguria, then it spread through Europe. In England, it was introduced at the court of Mary II in the late 17th century. Queen Mary taught it to her ladies-in-waiting.

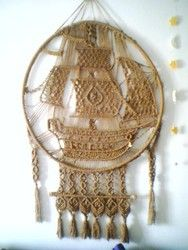
Decorative macramé ship

Macramé was most popular in the Victorian era. It adorned most homes in items such as tablecloths, bedspreads and curtains. The popular Sylvia's Book of Macramé Lace (1882) showed how "to work rich trimmings for black and coloured costumes, both for home wear, garden parties, seaside ramblings, and balls—fairylike adornments for household and underlinens ...".

It was a specialty in Genoa, and was popular in the 19th century. There, "Its roots were in a 16th-century technique of knotting lace known as punto a groppo".

Sailors made macramé objects while not busy at sea, and sold or bartered them when they landed. Nineteenth-century British and American sailors made hammocks, bell fringes, and belts from macramé. They called the process "square knotting" after the knot they used most often. Sailors also called macramé "McNamara's lace".

Macramé's popularity faded, but resurged in the 1970s for making wall hangings, clothing accessories, small jean shorts, bedspreads, tablecloths, draperies, plant hangers and other furnishings. Macramé jewelry became popular in America. Using mainly square knots and granny knots, this jewelry often features handmade glass beads and natural elements such as bone and shell. Necklaces, anklets and bracelets have become popular forms of macramé jewelry. By the early 1980s, macramé had again fallen out of fashion, with the exception of a brief revival by millennials in the late 2010s.

== Materials and process ==
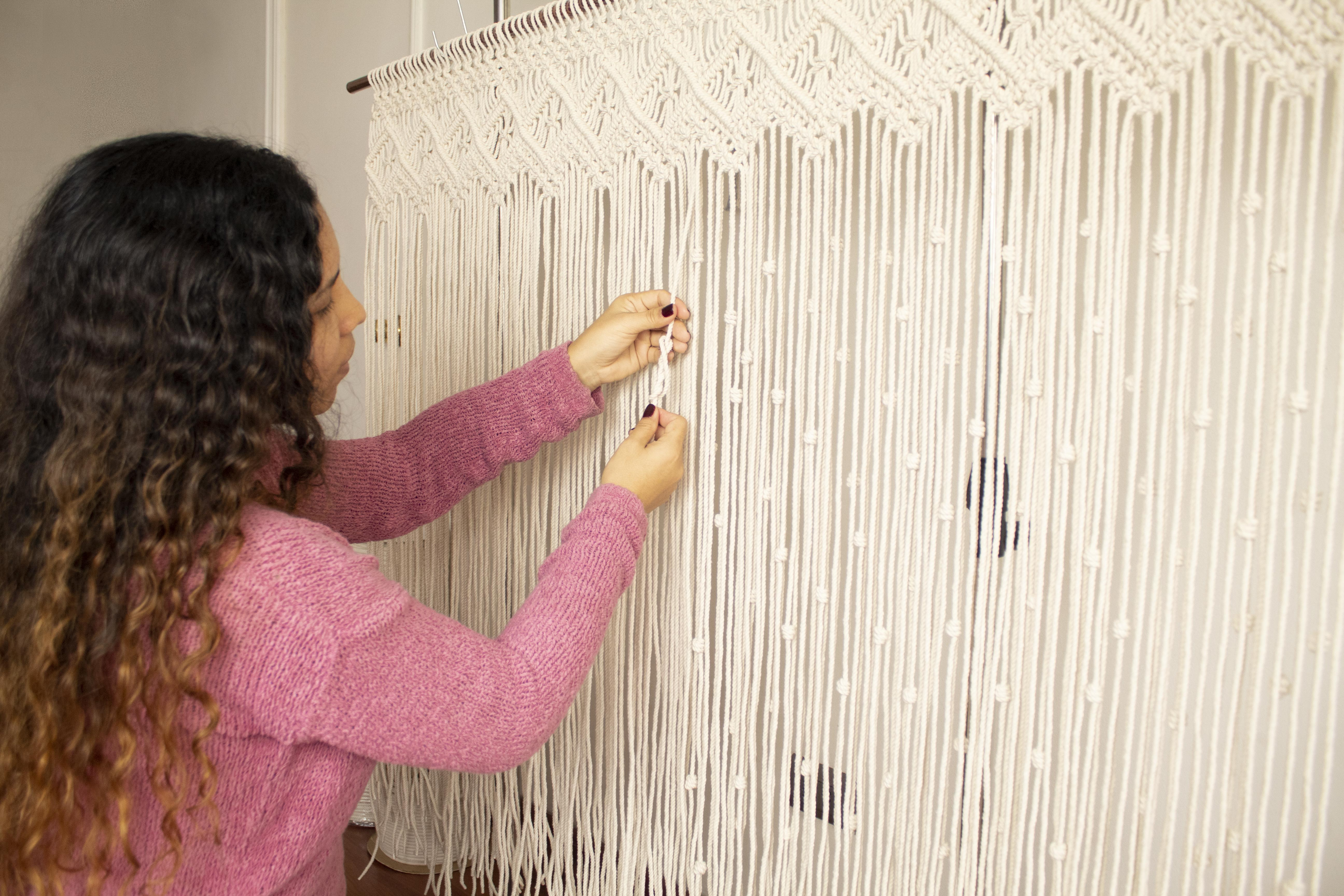
Production of a large piece of macramé

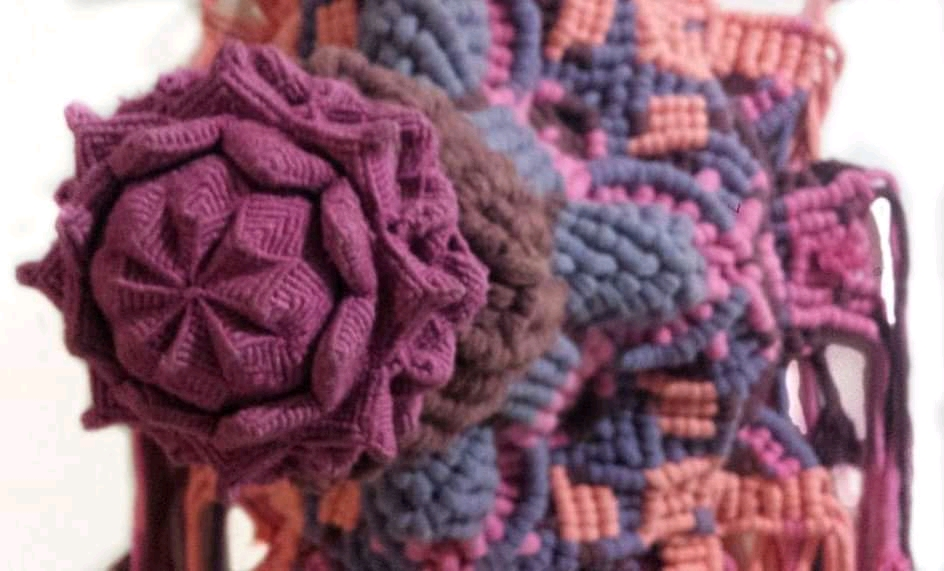
Decorative macramé from cotton and silk

Materials used in macramé include cords made of cotton twine, linen, hemp, jute, leather or yarn. Cords are identified by construction, such as a 3-ply cord, made of three lengths of fibre twisted together. Jewelry is often made in combination of both the knots and various beads (of glass, wood, and so on), pendants or shells. Sometimes 'found' focal points are used for necklaces, such as rings or gemstones, either wire-wrapped to allow for securing or captured in a net-like array of intertwining overhand knots. A knotting board is often used to mount the cords for macramé work. Cords may be held in place using a C-clamp, straight pins, T-pins, U-pins, or upholstery pins.

For larger decorative pieces, such as wall hangings or window coverings, a work of macramé might be started out on a wooden or metal dowel, allowing for a spread of dozens of cords that are easy to manipulate. For smaller projects, push-pin boards are available specifically for macramé, although a simple corkboard works adequately. Many craft stores offer beginners' kits, work boards, beads and materials ranging in price for the casual hobbyist or ambitious crafter.

== See also ==
- Chinese knotting
- List of hitch knots
- Sennit
- Crochet
