= Mizuhiki =

Traditional Japanese paper artform

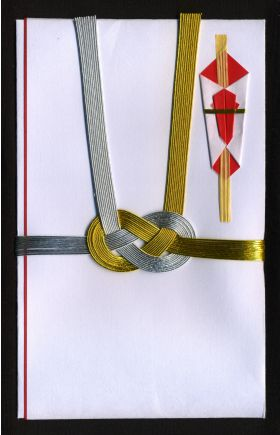
Mizuhiki on an envelope — this photo shows gold and silver kekkon mizuhiki adorning a shūgi-bukuro, commonly used when giving monetary gifts at weddings.

Mizuhiki (水引, lit. 'water-pull') is an ancient Japanese artform of knot-tying, most commonly used to decorate envelopes, called kinpū, which are given as gifts during holidays like Japanese New Year (and are then called otoshidama) or for special occasions such as births and weddings (shūgi-bukuro) or funerals (kōden-bukuro). The colour of the cord depends on the occasion, or may signify the religious denomination of the giver at funerals.

The stiff washi paper cord that is used, also called mizuhiki, is created by twisting lengths of washi paper together tightly, before starching them for strength and stiffness, and colouring them with mylar or thin strands of silk, or simply by painting the cord.

The art of mizuhiki dates back to Japan's Asuka period, during which an envoy from the Sui dynasty brought gifts embellished with red and white hemp strings.

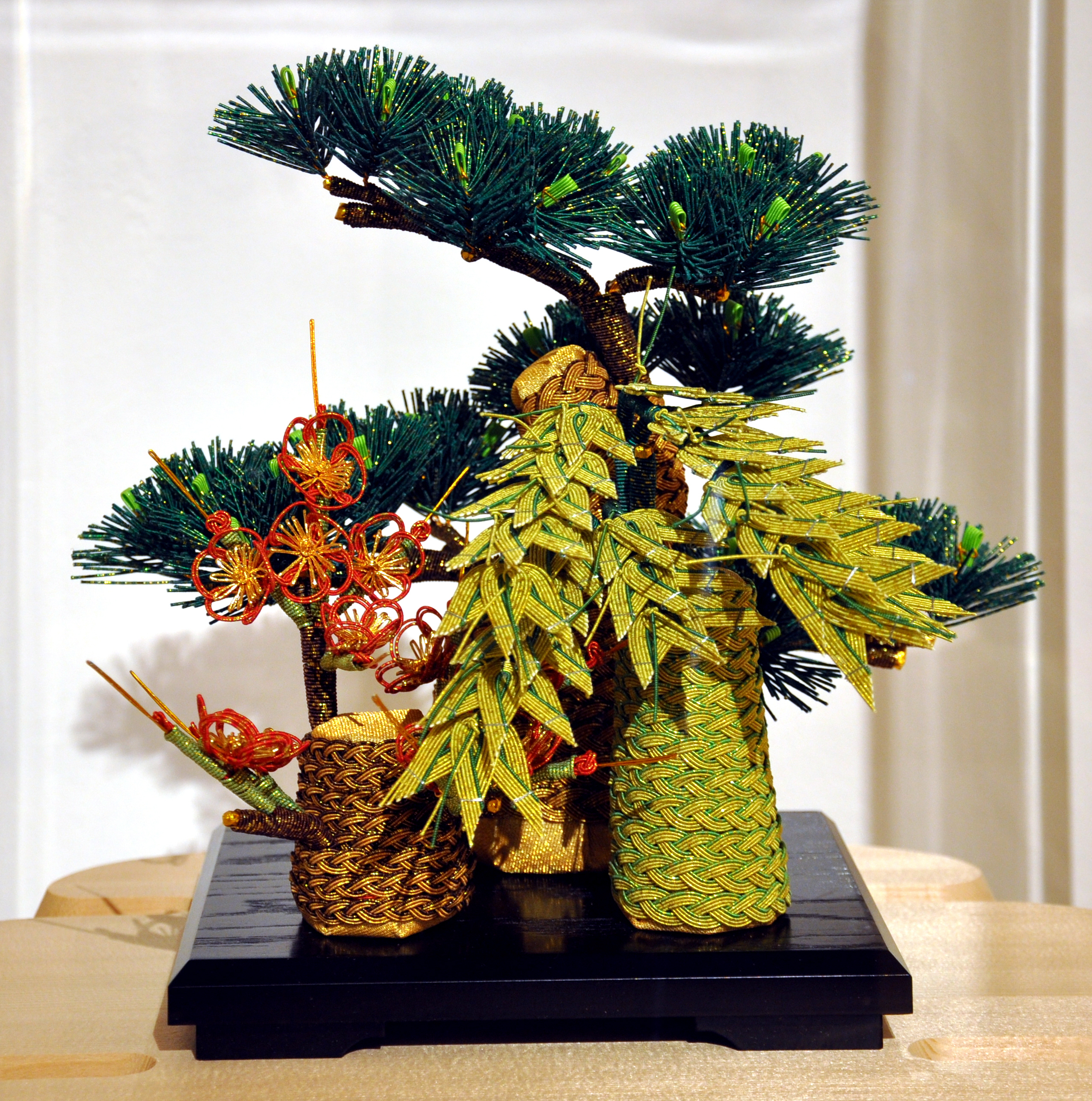
Model of a bonsai tree, an engagement present made from mizuhiki.

Other forms of mizuhiki include using the cord to create paper jewellery, or creating three-dimensional art with different forms used for different auspicious meanings; cranes, frogs, fish, dragons and turtles are amongst the most popular.

In 2019, the Modern Mizuhiki Association was founded in Tokyo.

== See also ==
- Japanese craft
- Genda Shigyō, a producer of mizuhiki and one of the oldest companies in the world
- Hojōjutsu
- Kirikane
- Kumihimo
- Meibutsu
- Shūgi-bukuro, envelopes typically decorated with mizuhiki
  - Red envelope
