= Button knot =

Type of knot

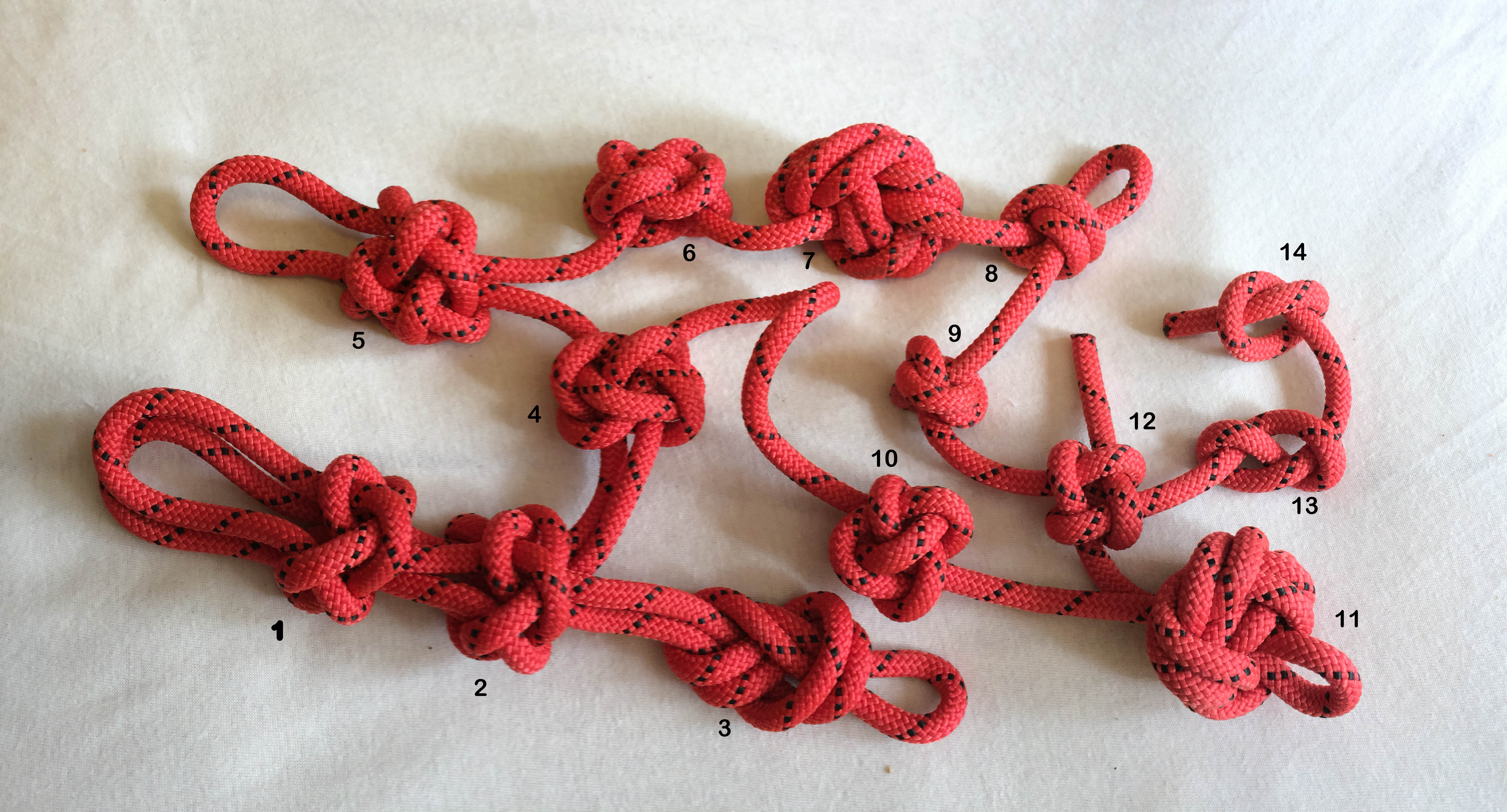
- Names: Button knot, Stopper knots, As numbered in picture : 1- Fiador, 2- Sailor's diamond (#693), 3- Figure-eight loop, 4- Diamond, 5- knife lanyard, 6- Chinese button, 7- Chinese button doubled, 8- True lover's, 9- Ashley's, 10- Celtic button, 11- Celtic button on the bight (and thus doubled and with lanyard loop), 12- Friendship, 13- Figure-eight, 14- Overhand
- Typical use: Keeps the line from slipping out of things.

A button knot is a knot that forms a bulge of thread. Button knots are essentially stopper knots, but may be aesthetically pleasing enough to be used as a button on clothes.

The single-strand button is a third type of knob knot, in which the working end leaves the knot at the neck, parallel with the standing part, so that the two parts, or ends, together form a stem. The lay of the two ends is the same, and the knot is symmetrical throughout. -- The Ashley Book of Knots

There are many methods for tying button knots, such as the Chinese button knot, the Celtic button knot and the monkey fist. The Ashley Book of Knots contains over a hundred examples.

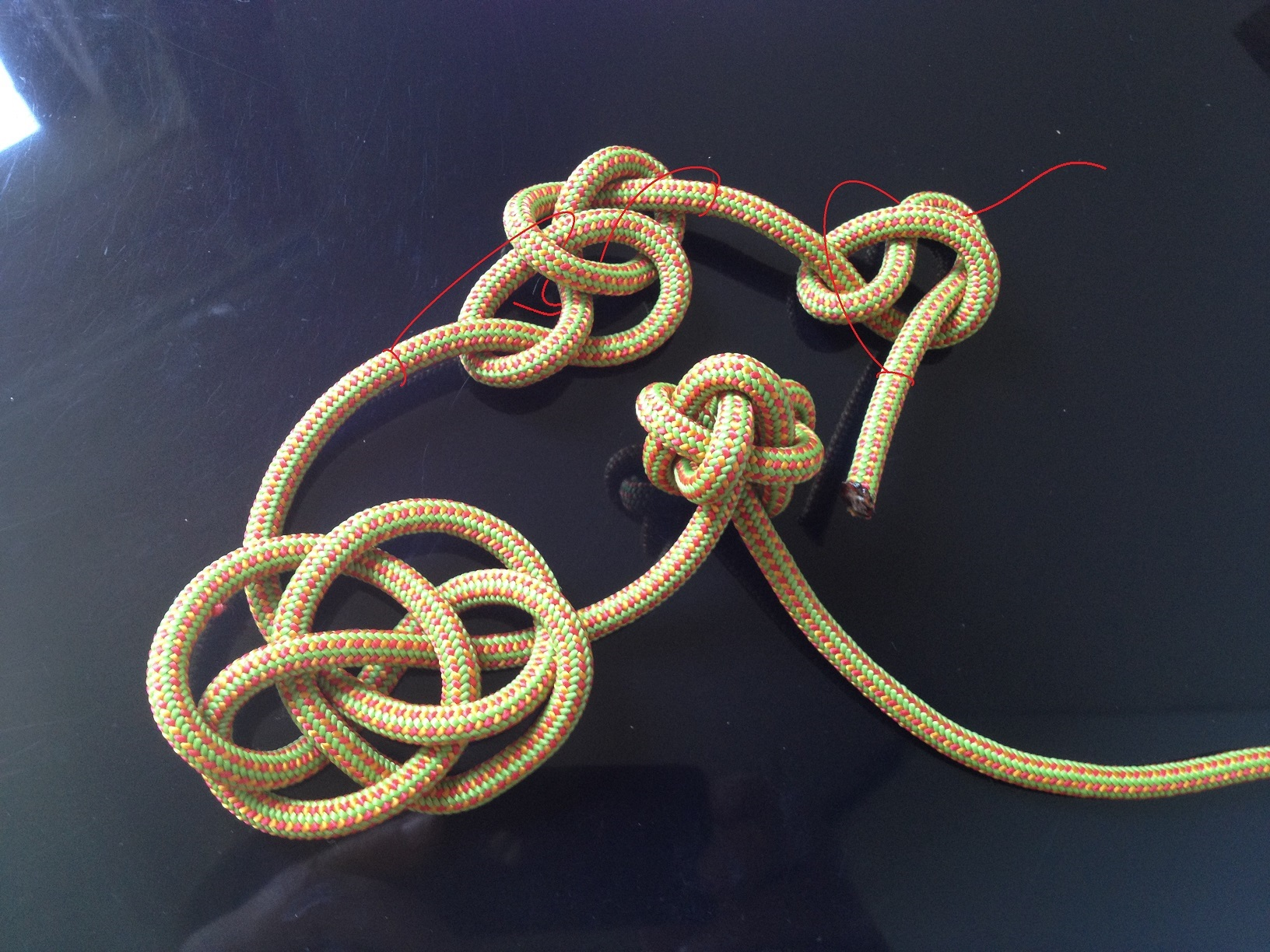
Celtic button knot single, with 4 steps of tying it

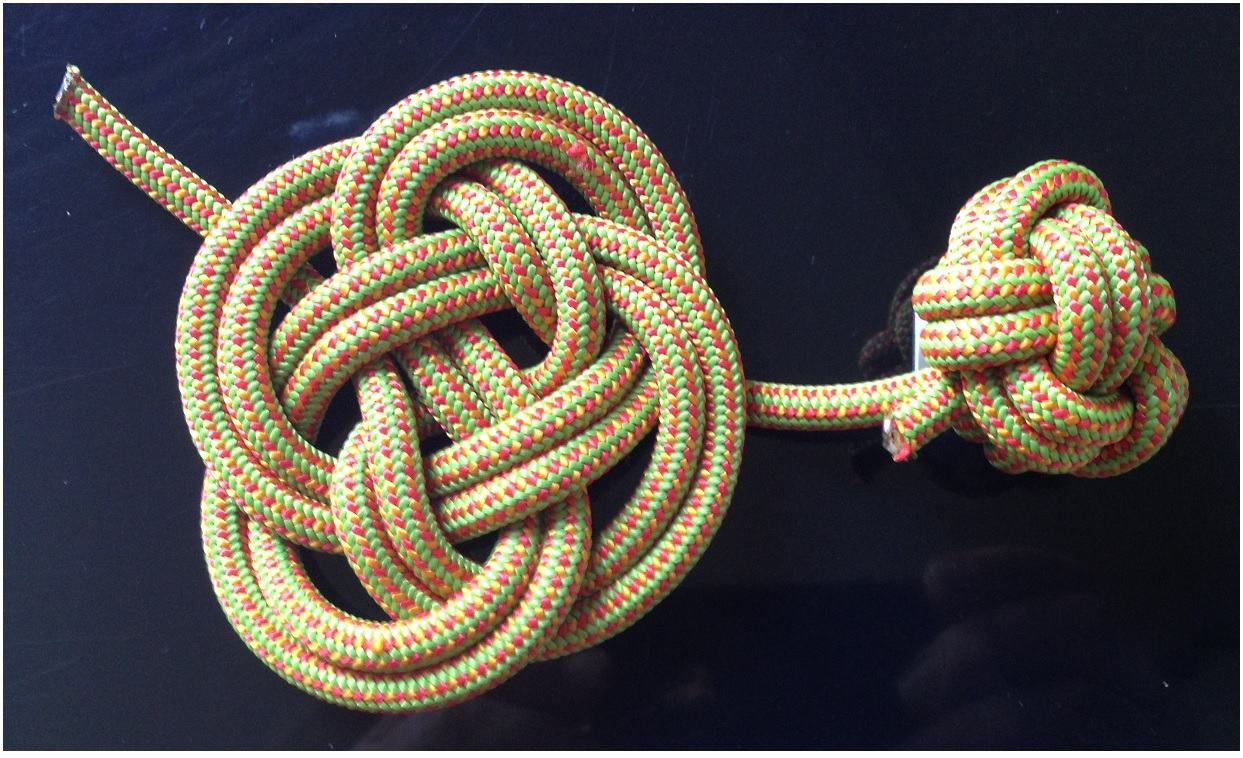
Celtic button knot double, flat and tightened forms

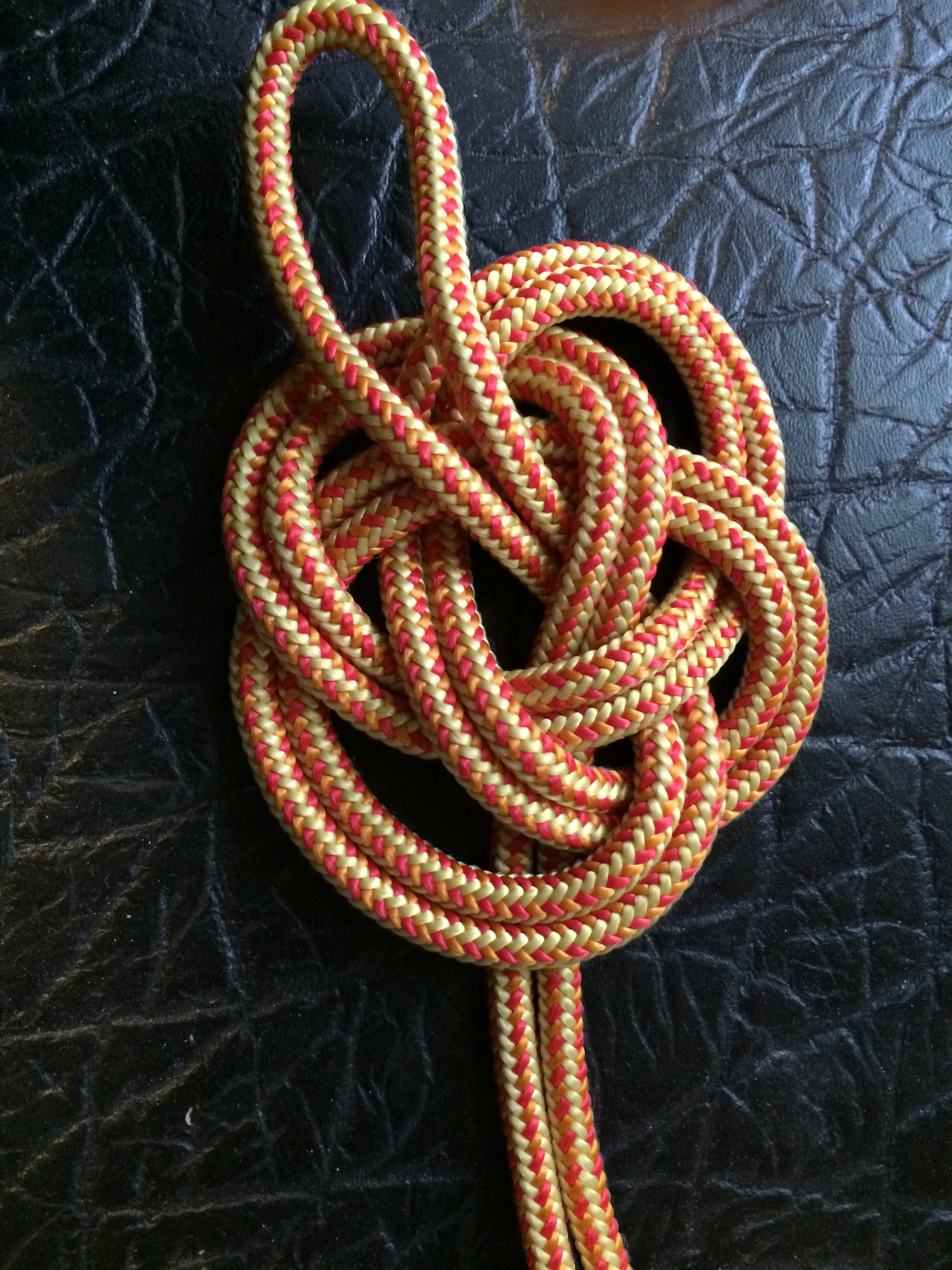
Celtic button knot formed on the bight, untightened - flat

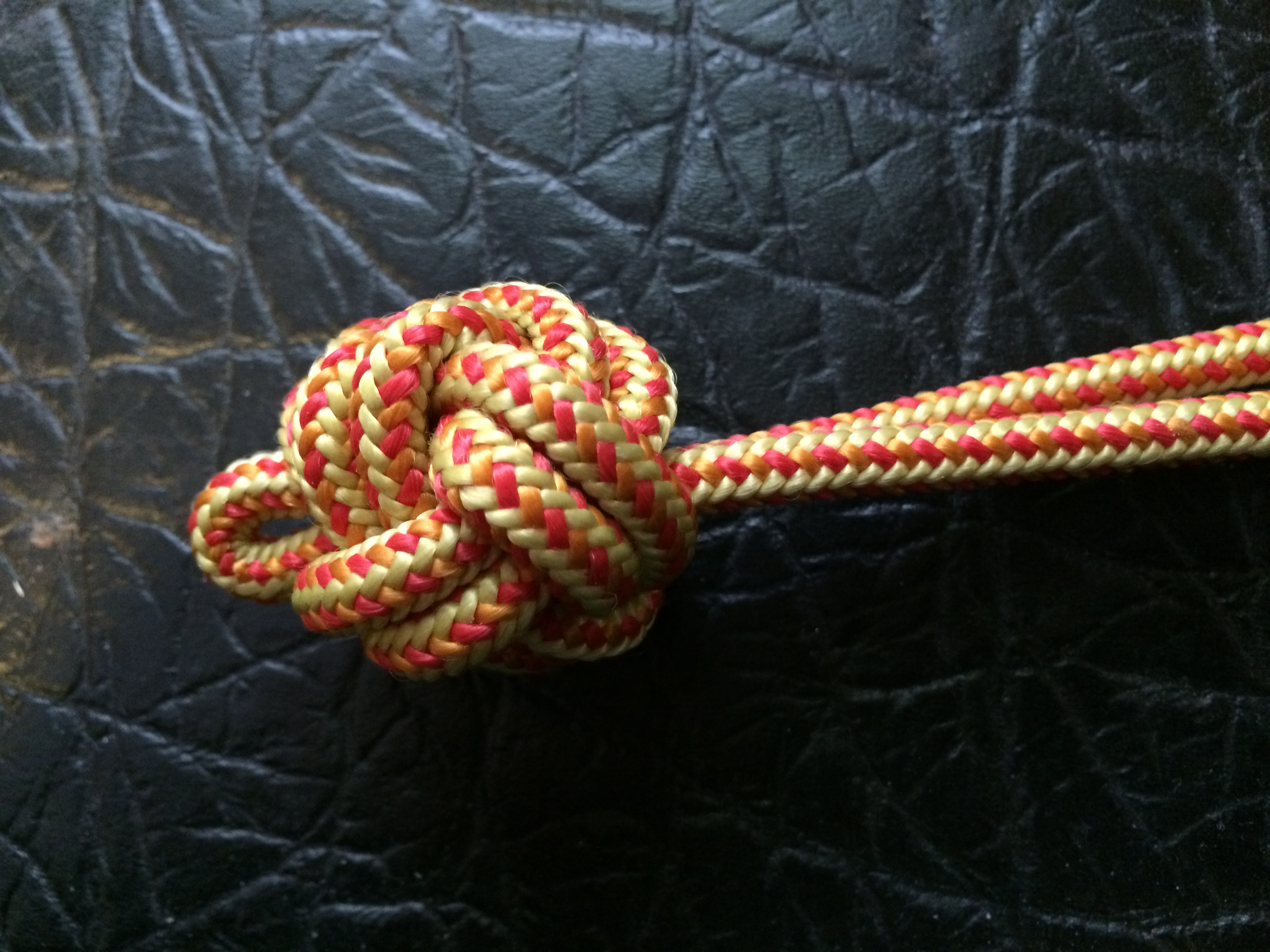
Celtic button knot formed on the bight, tightened

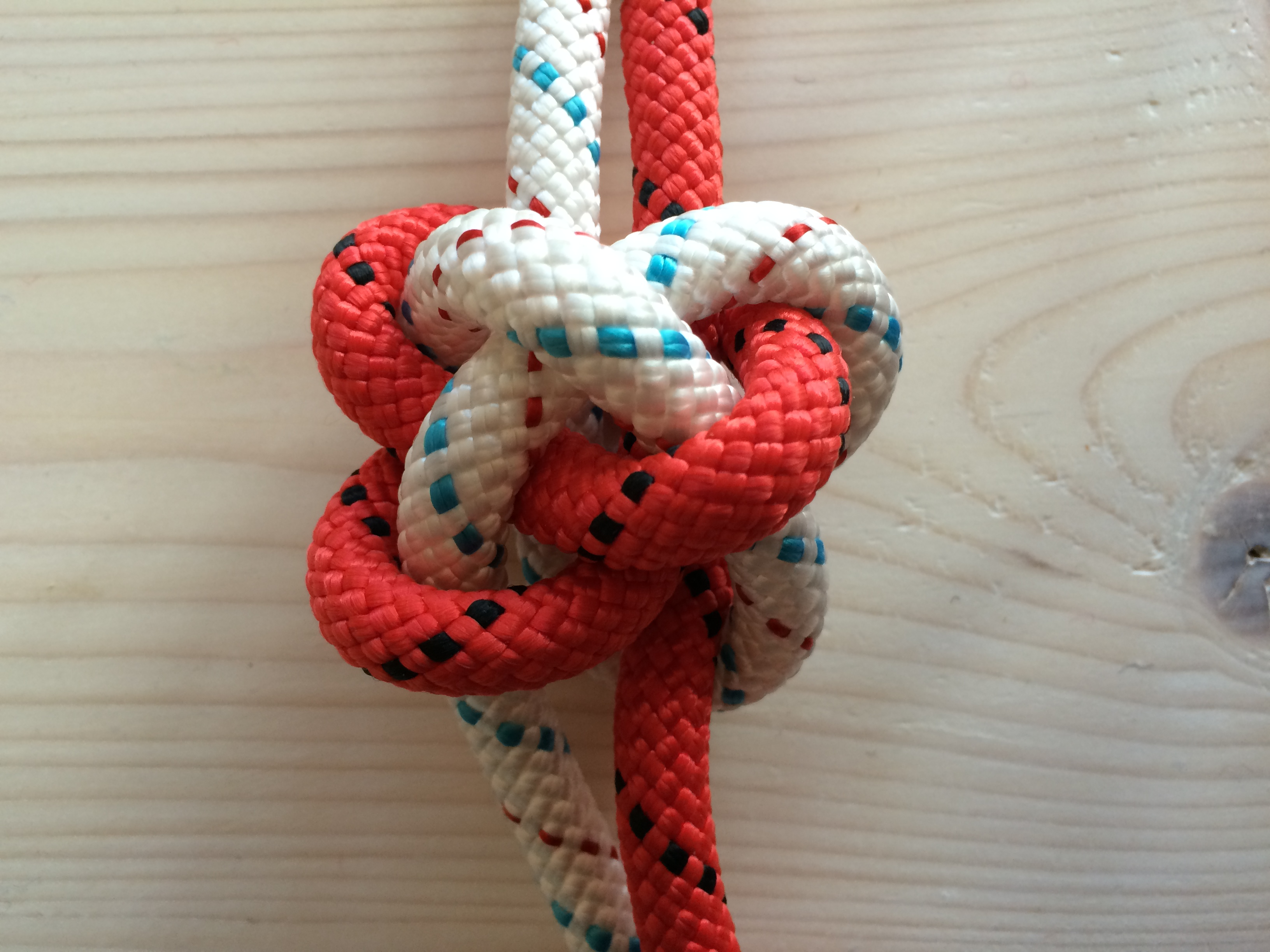
Chinese button knot front side

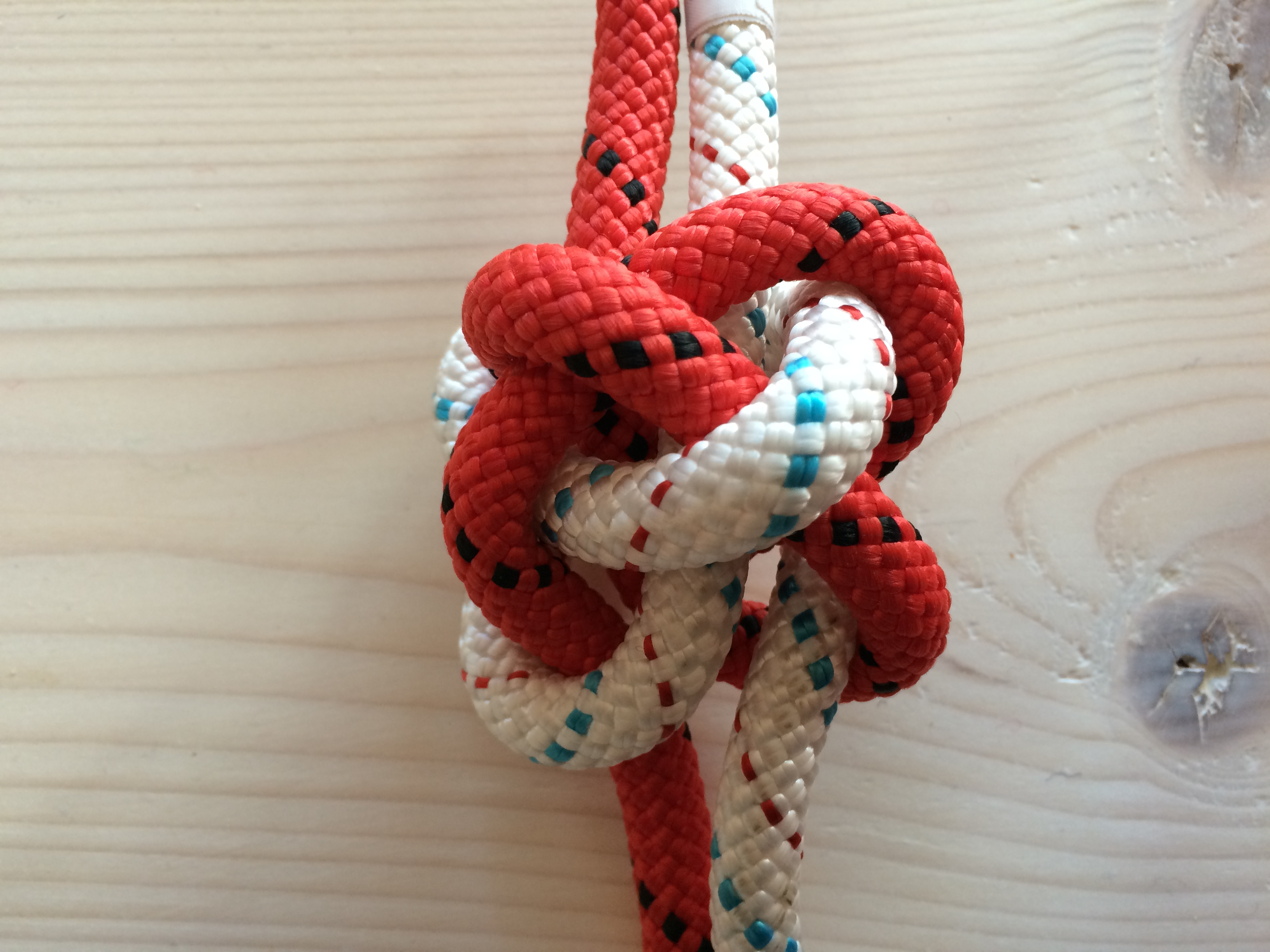
Chinese button knot back side

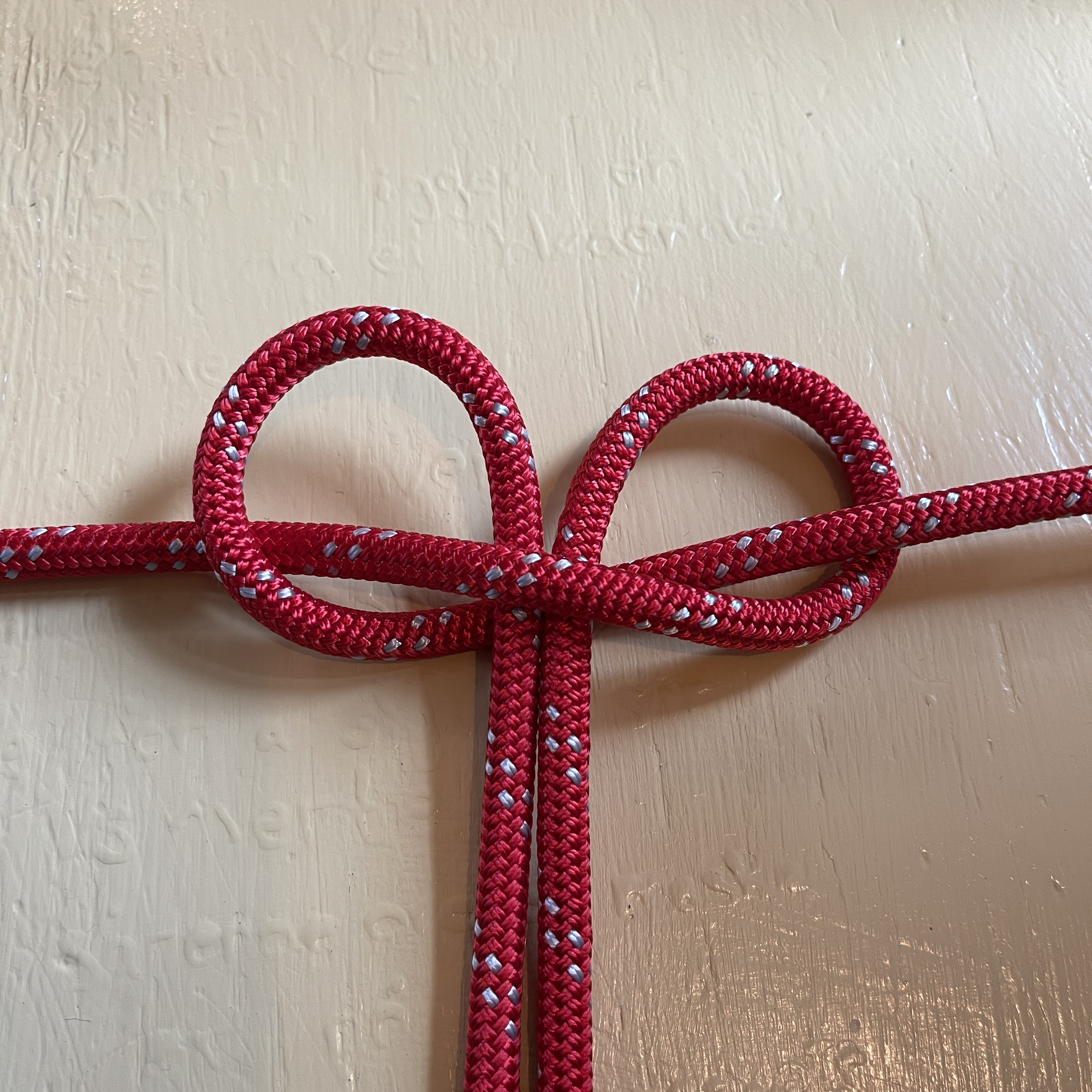
Rose knot on 2 ropes step1 wall

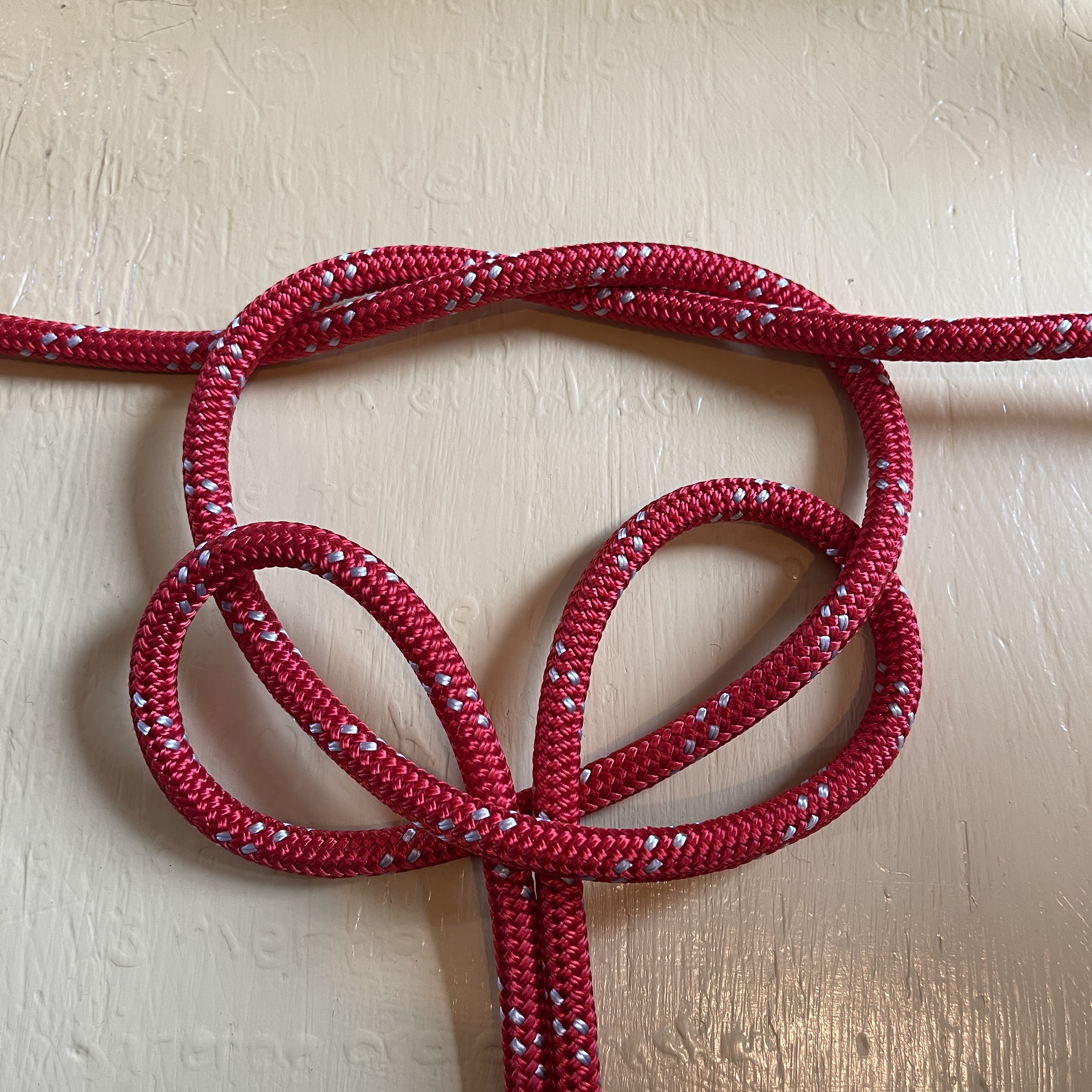
Rose knot on 2 ropes step2 crown

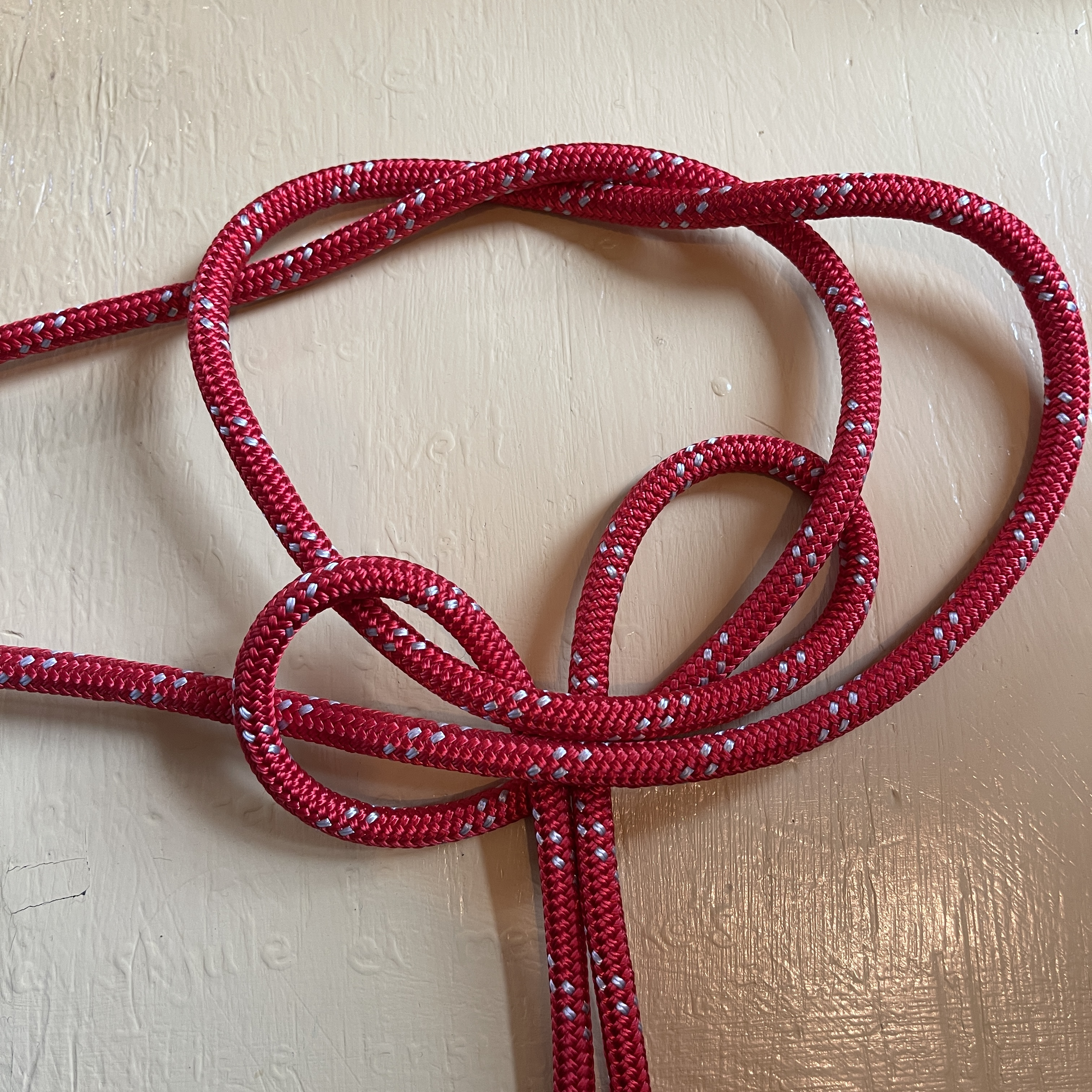
Rose knot on 2 ropes step3

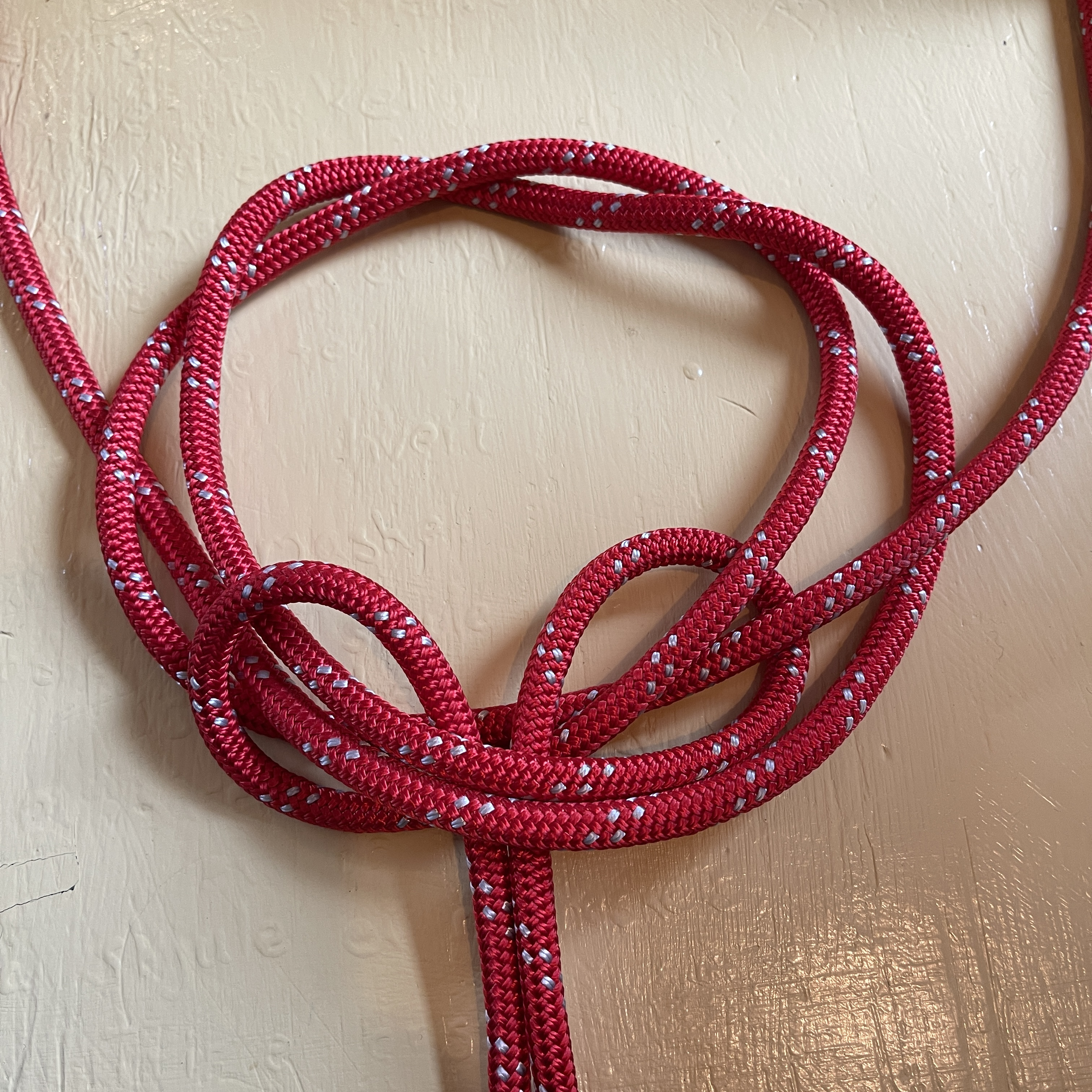
Rose knot on 2 ropes step4 second wall

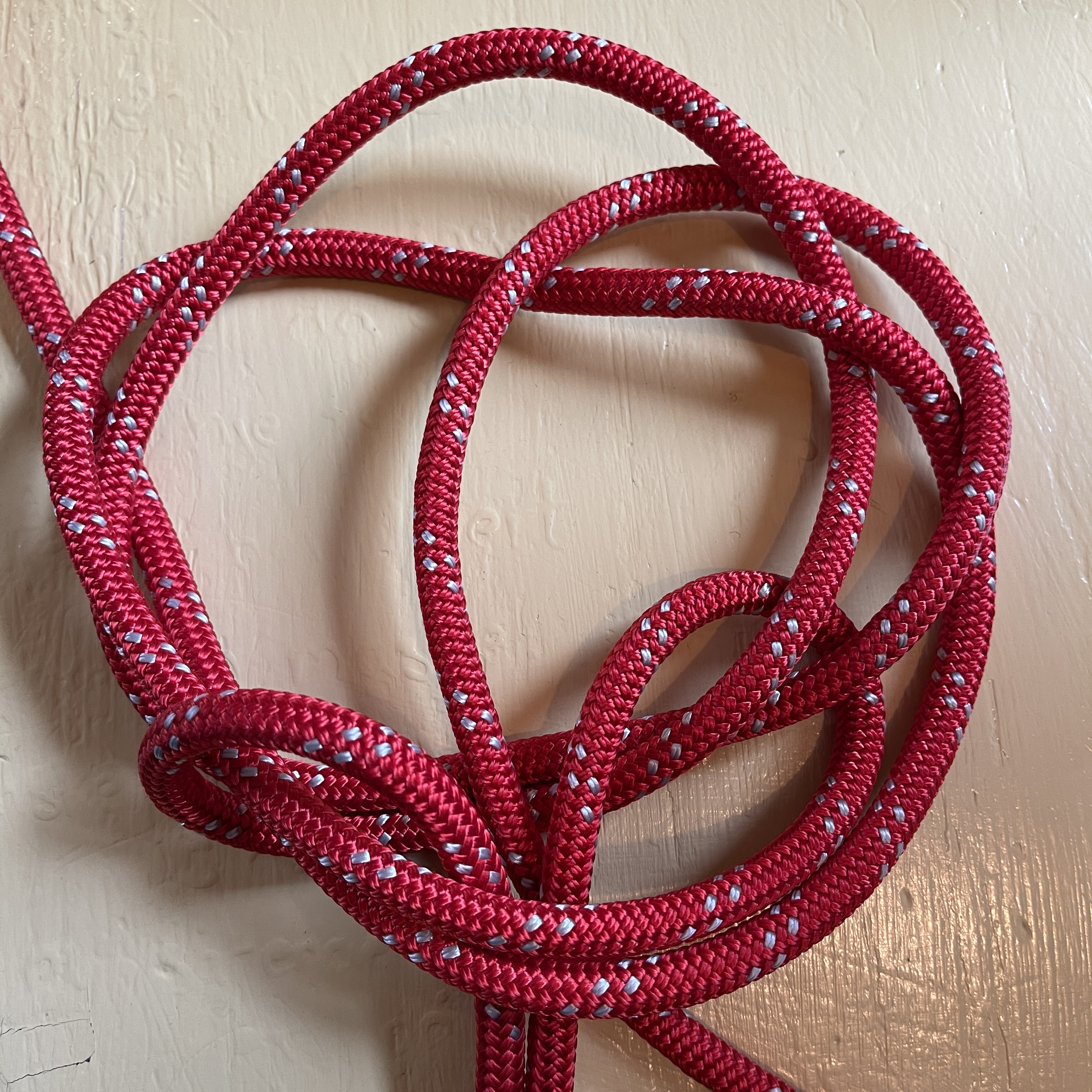
Rose knot on 2 ropes step5

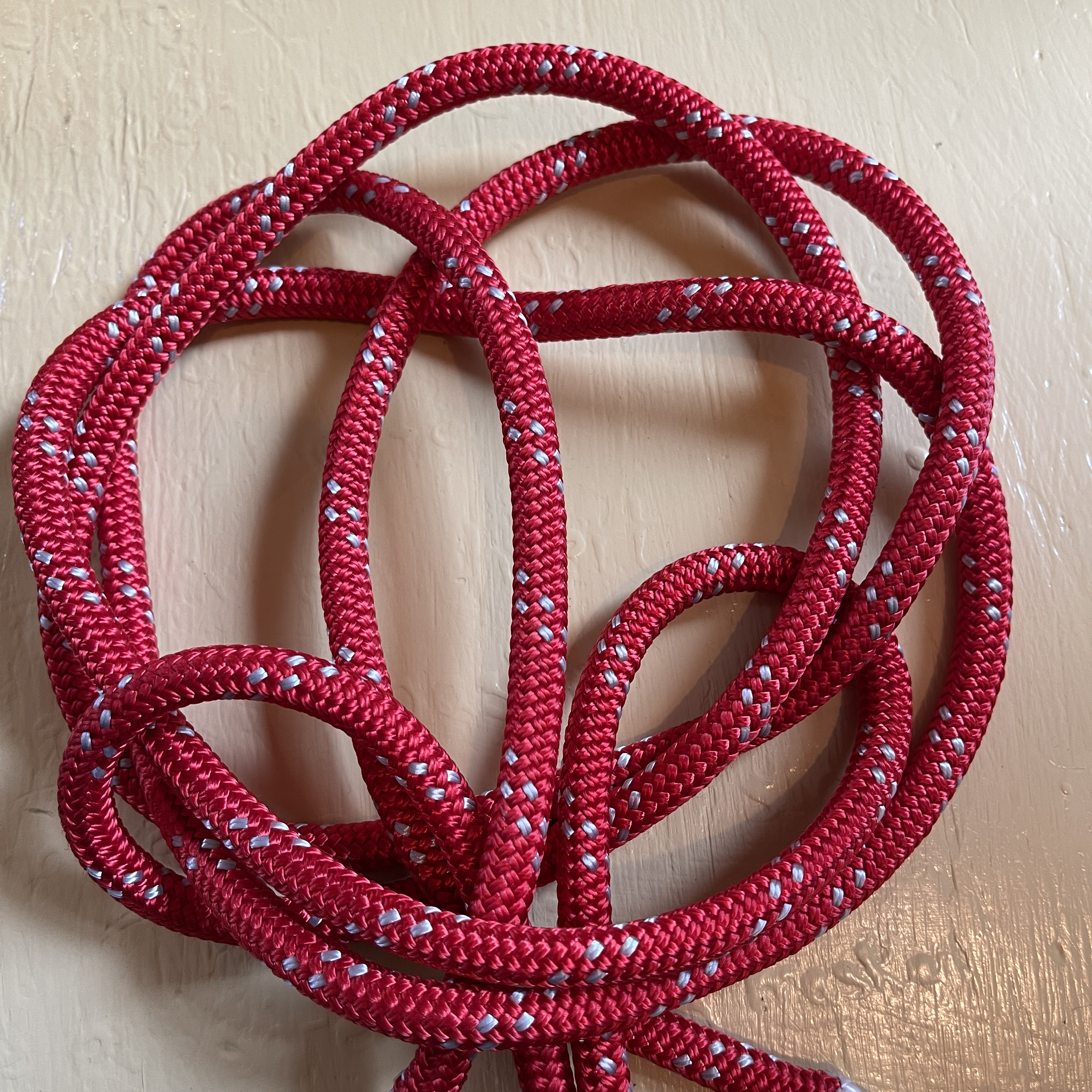
Rose knot on 2 ropes step6 second crown and tucked ends

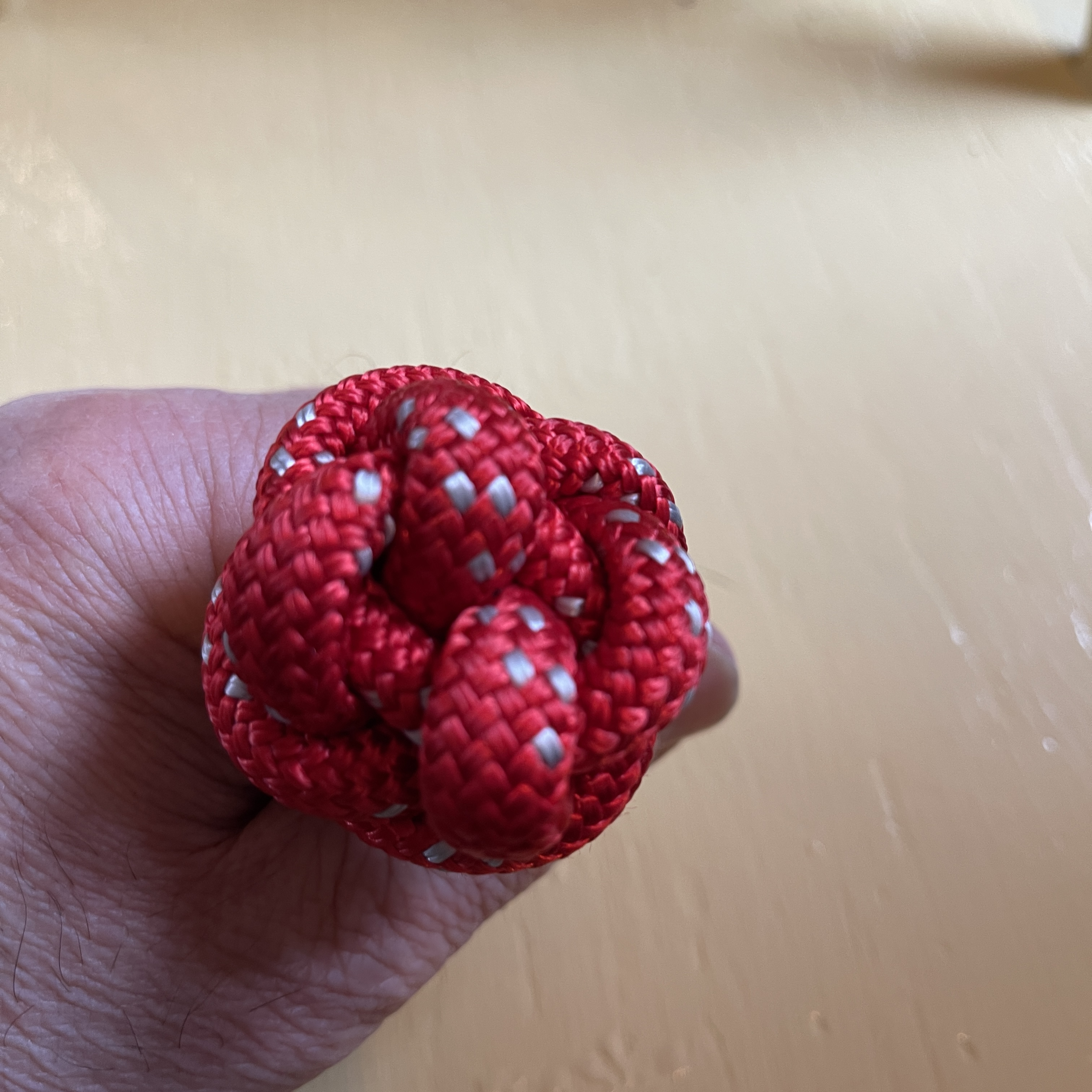
Rose knot on 2 ropes top view

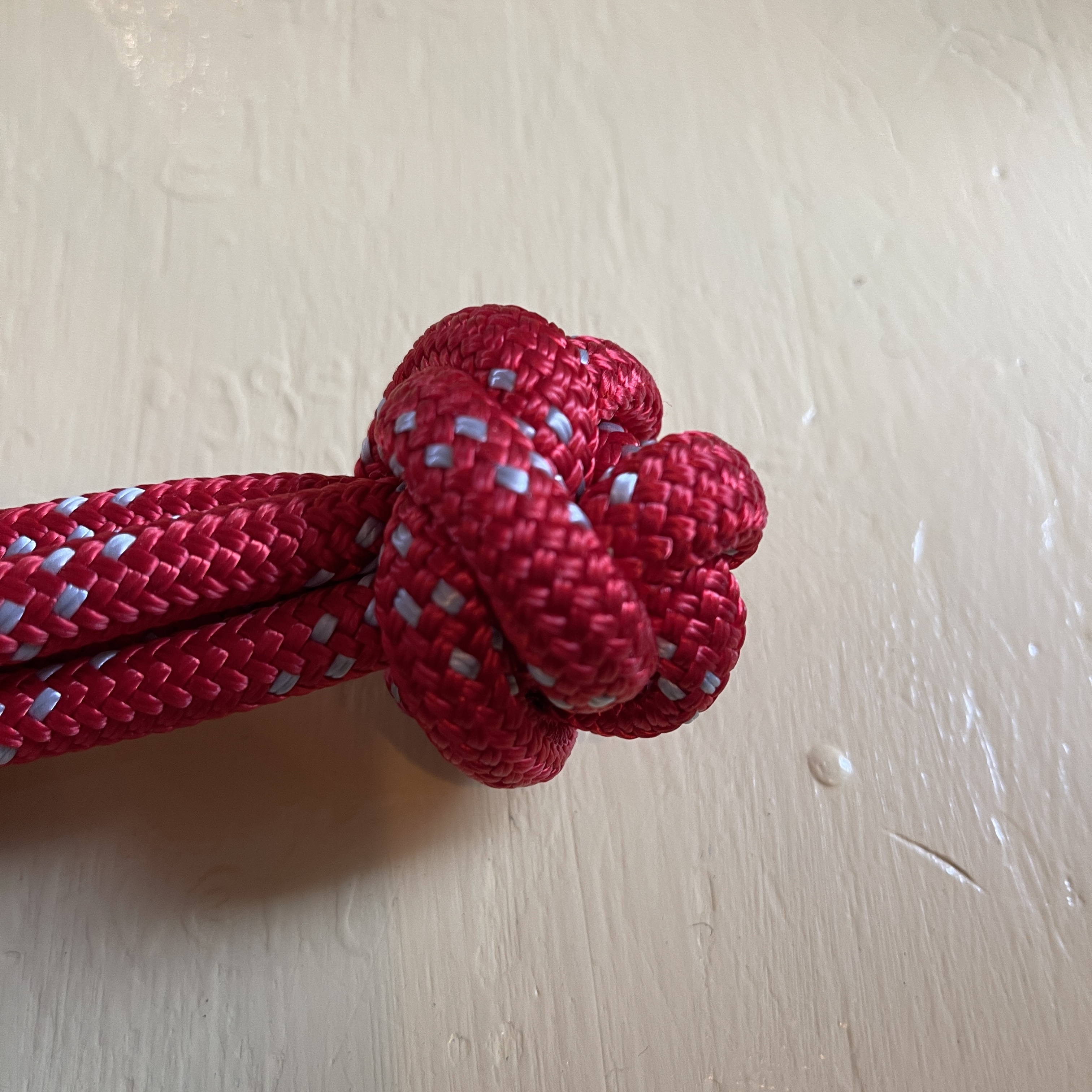
Rose knot on 2 ropes side view

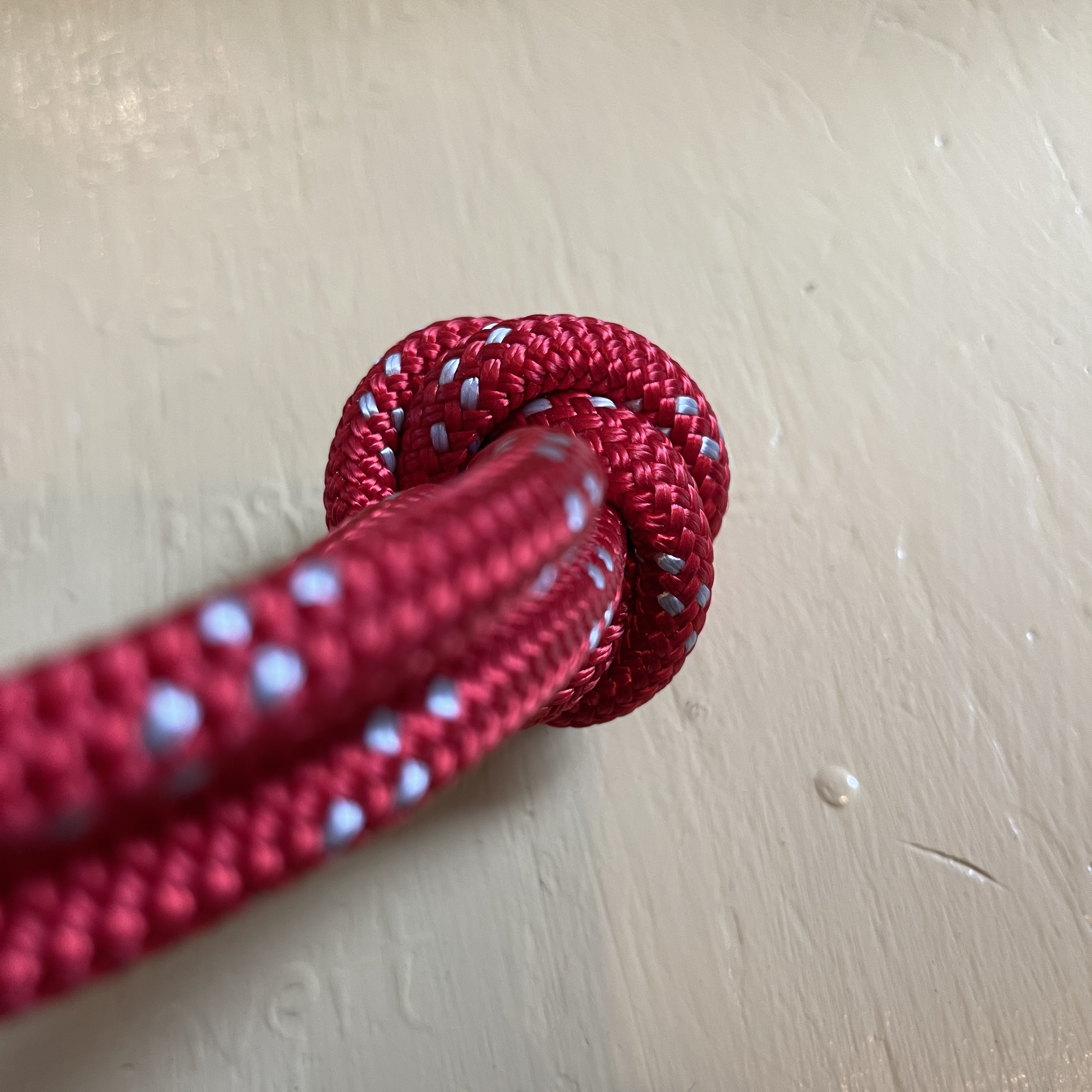
Rose knot on 2 ropes back view, animated tying

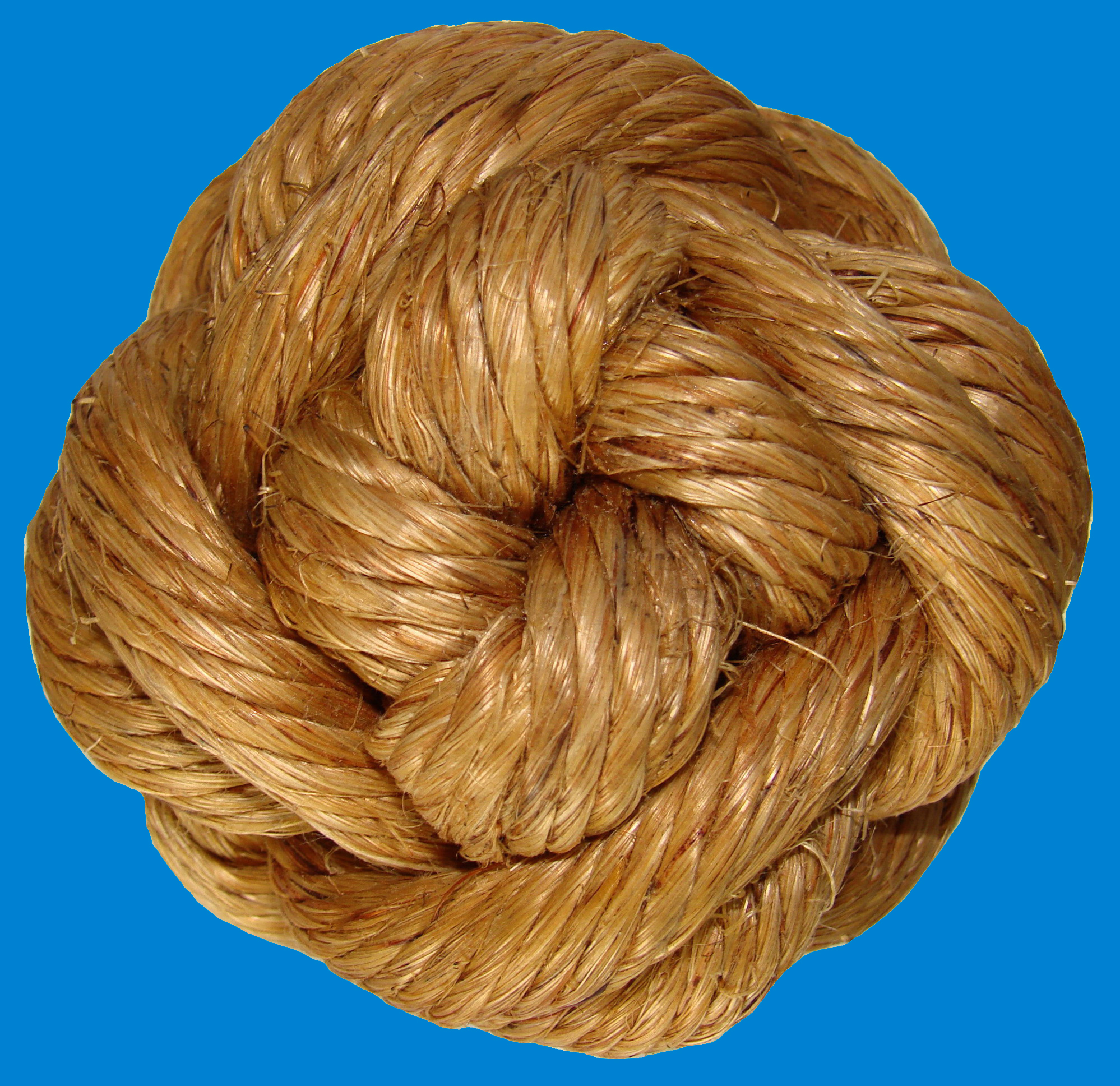
Rose knot on 4 ropes

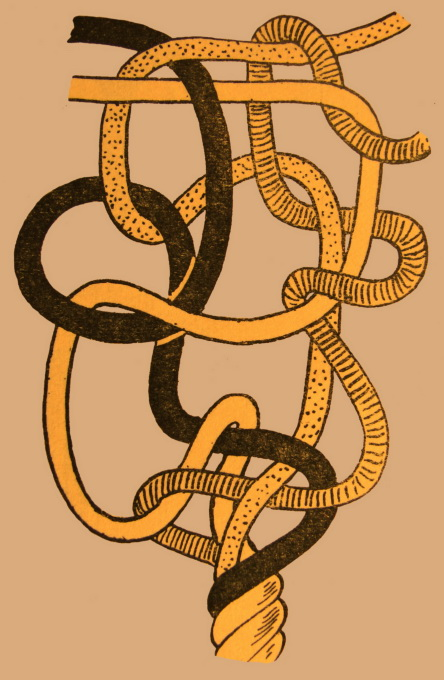
tying of Rose knot on 4 ropes

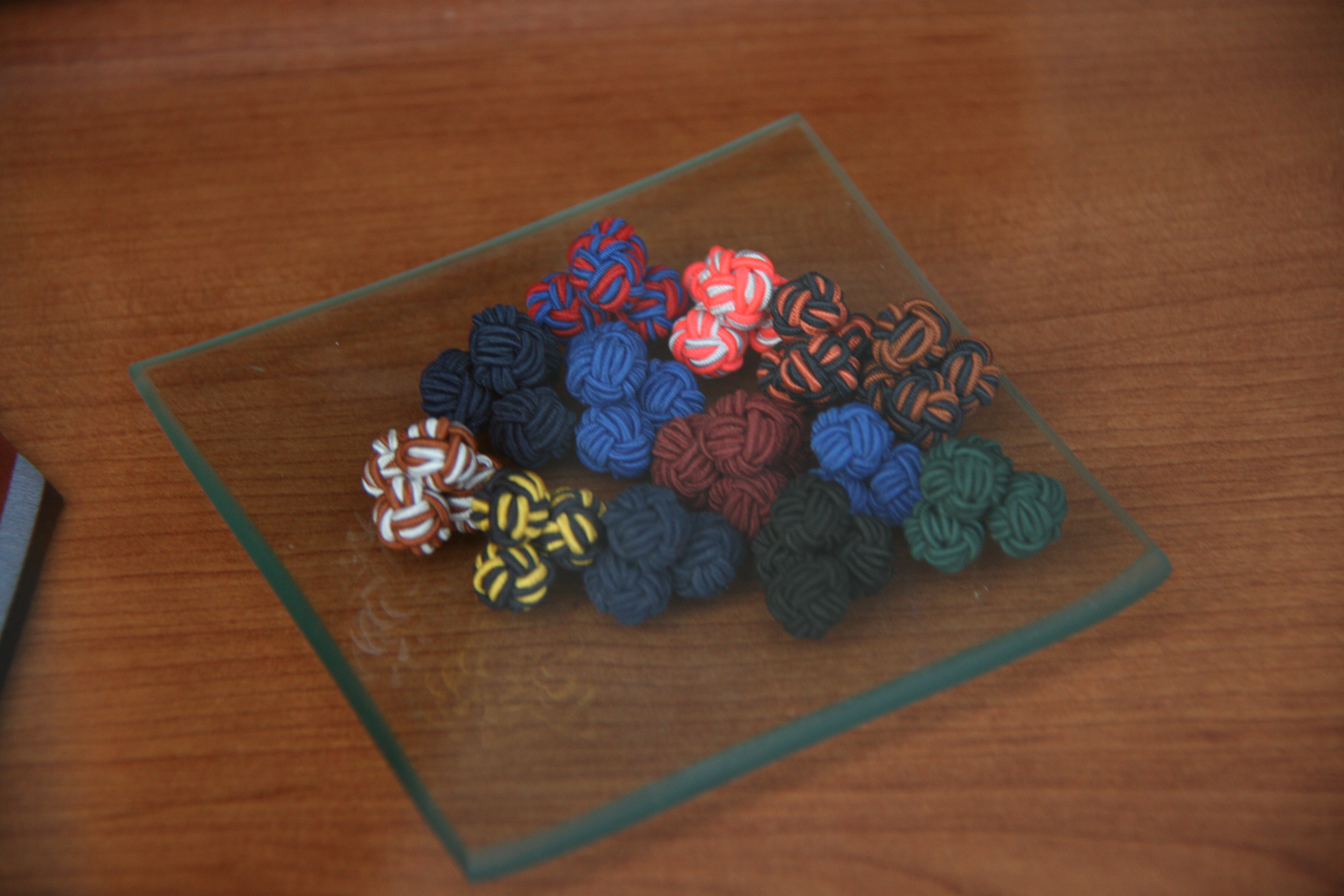
Pairs of monkey's fists formed as cufflinks in silk

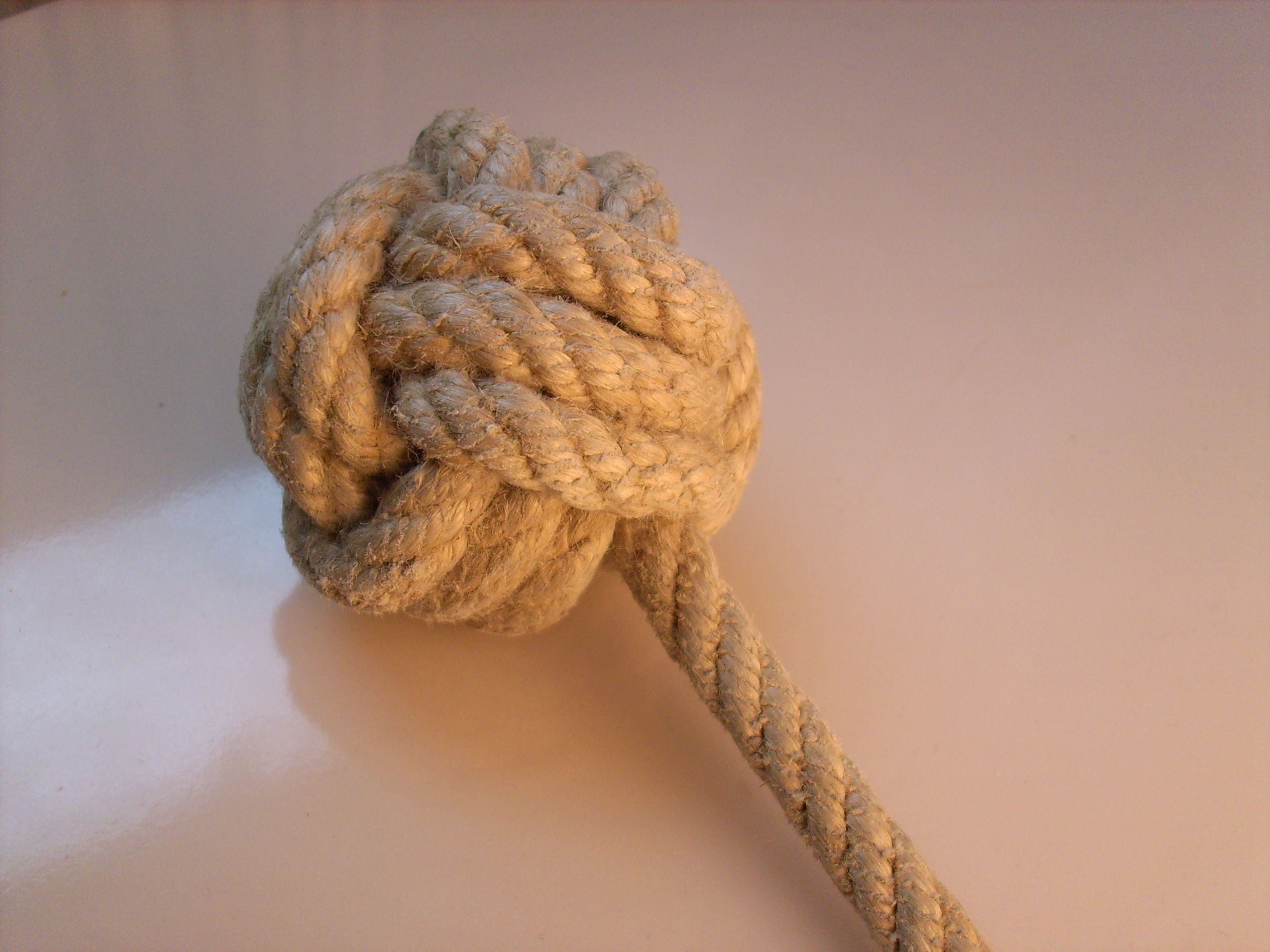
a larger monkey's fist formed with a thicker rope

a heavy monkey's fist for throwing with an eye splice
