= Celtic button knot =

Type of knot

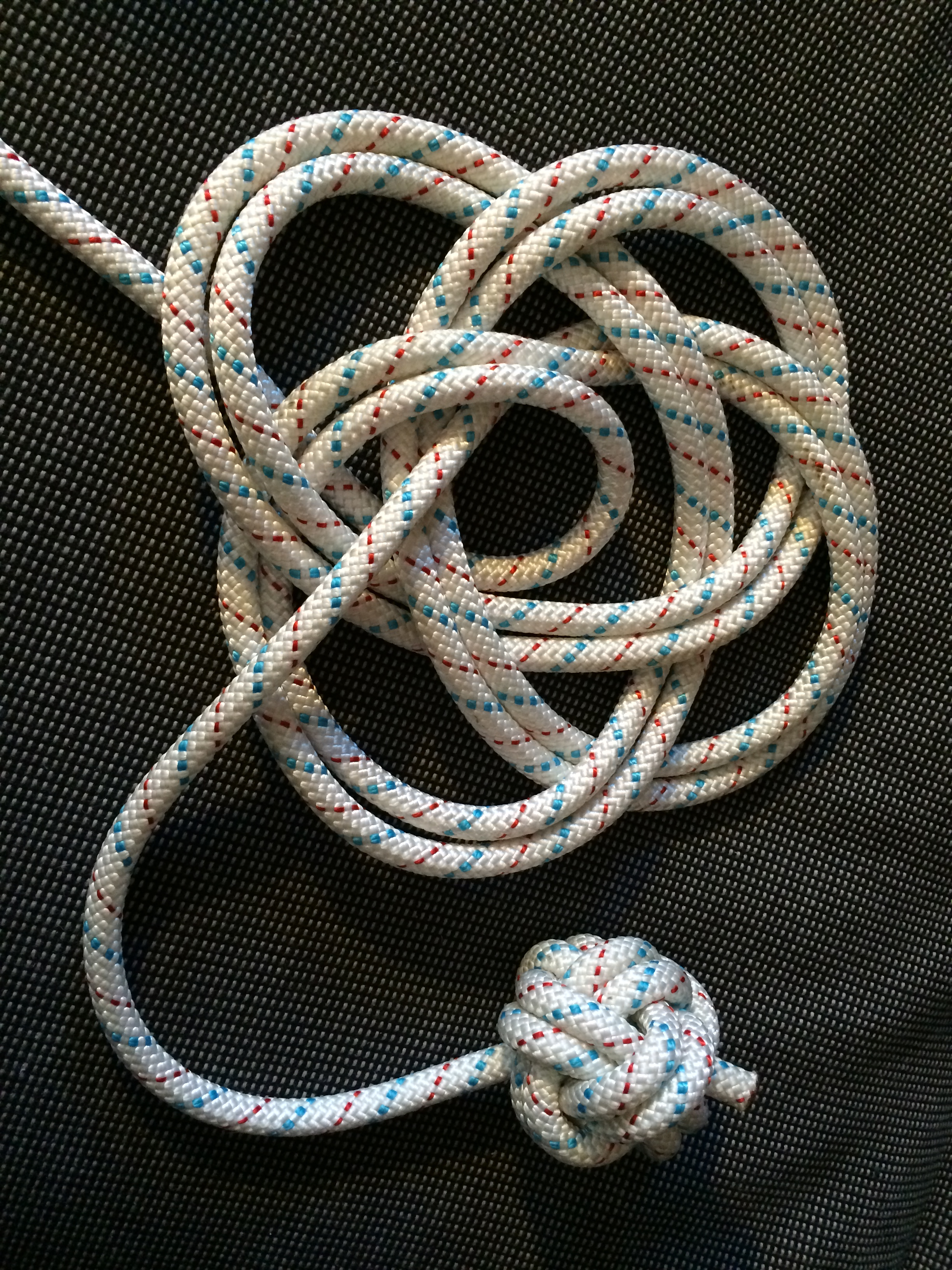
- Celtic button knot double pass version, both flat and tightened
- Category: Stopper
- Category 2: Decorative
- Related: diamond knot, Chinese button knot
- ABoK: #545

A Celtic button knot is a stopper knot on a single rope that results in a spherical decorative knot with hair braid / basket weave pattern. It is essentially a single strand Turk's Head Knot that is structured such a way that it is effectively tied around the rope itself, creating a stopper. It typically is used as a button, or as a knot securing the end of the rope from fraying.

== Tying ==
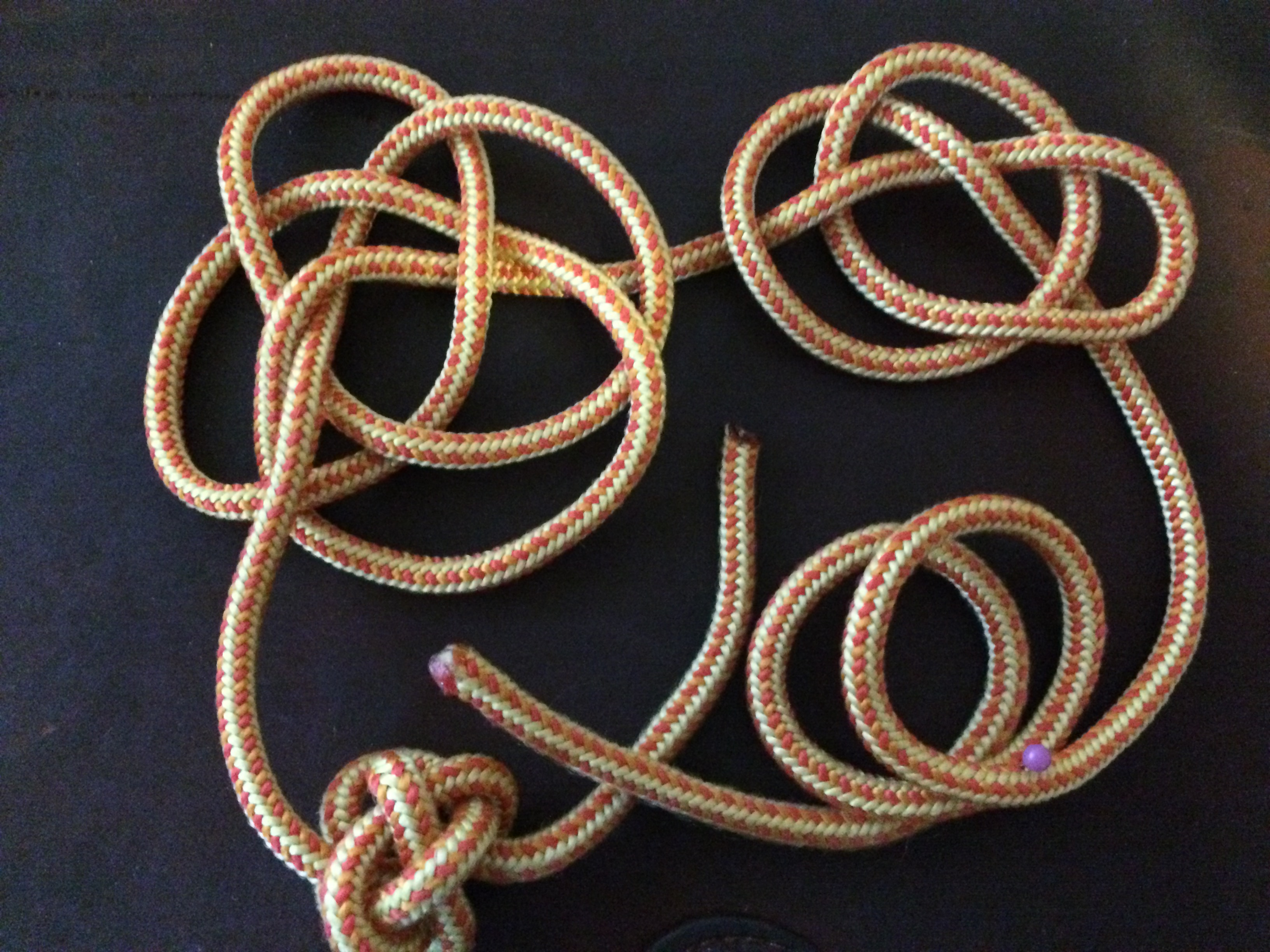
Celtic button knots 4 steps; RB: two overhand loops, RT: third loop: over-under-over-under, LT: fourth loop: over-under-under-over, LB: tightened

There are 4 main steps to tying the Celtic knot:

1. two consecutive overhand loops, the last one placed partially over the first forming two petals of a four petal flower
2. left end woven from right horizontally through the loops; over, under, over, under forming the third petal
3. left end woven again from left: over the edge, under, under, over and up through the central hole finishing the four petal flower
  1. optional: pushing the end again into the knot following the main part consistently on the inside. This may be repeated to give volume to the knot
4. tightening evenly to close the petals of the flower forming a sphere around the main part
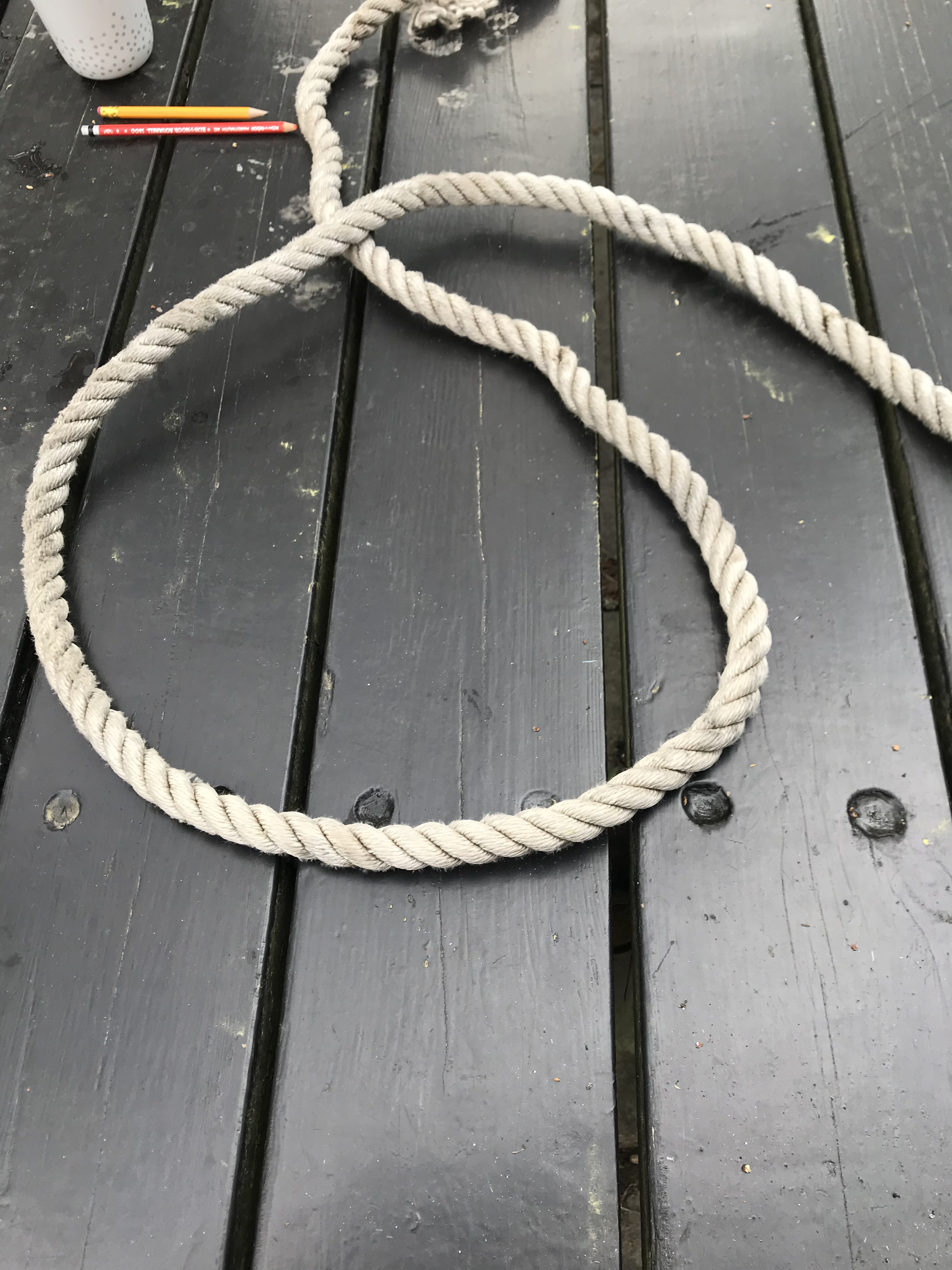
Step one of tying a Celtic Button knot is a simple loop

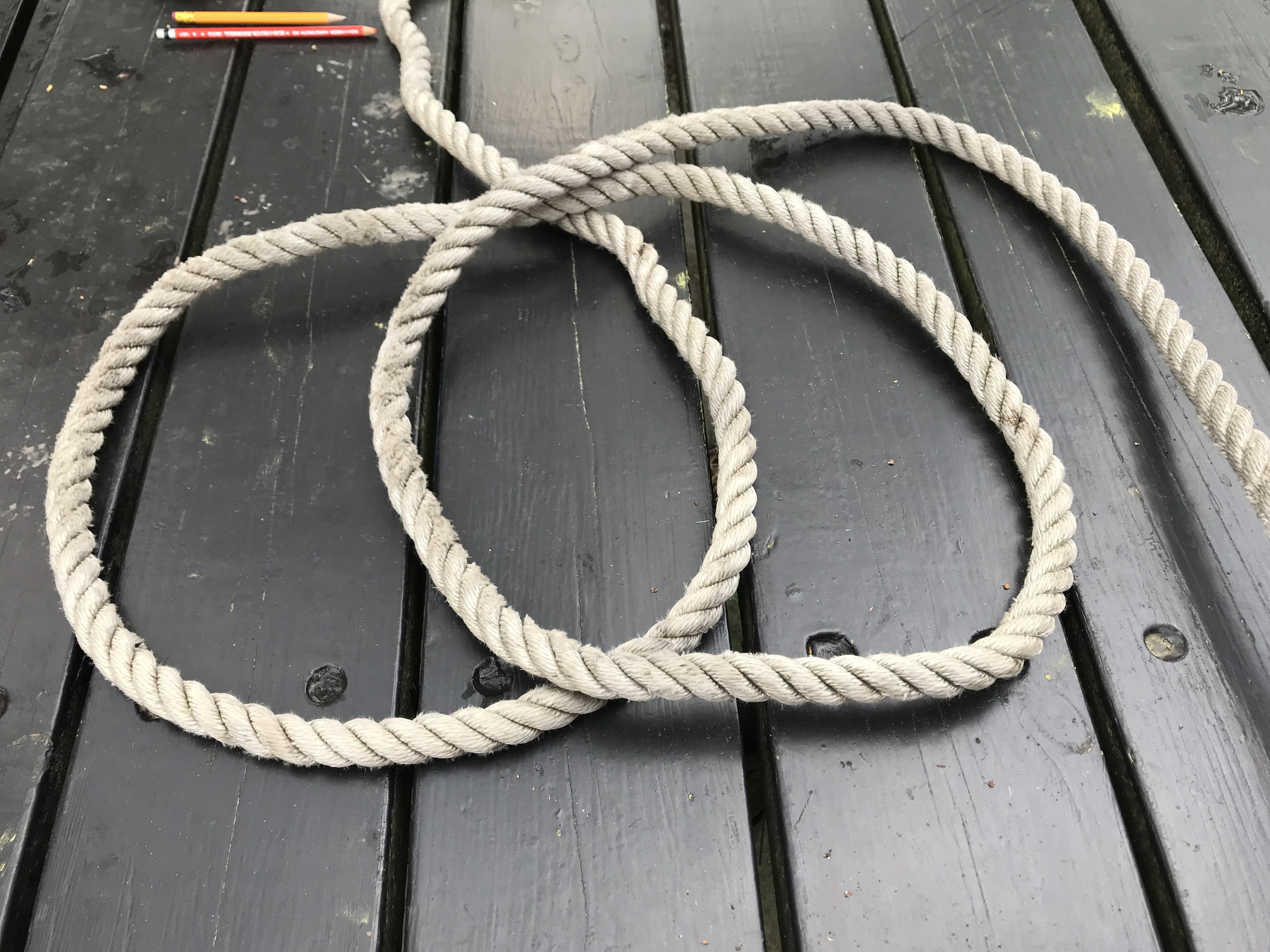
Step two of tying a Celtic Button knot is another loop

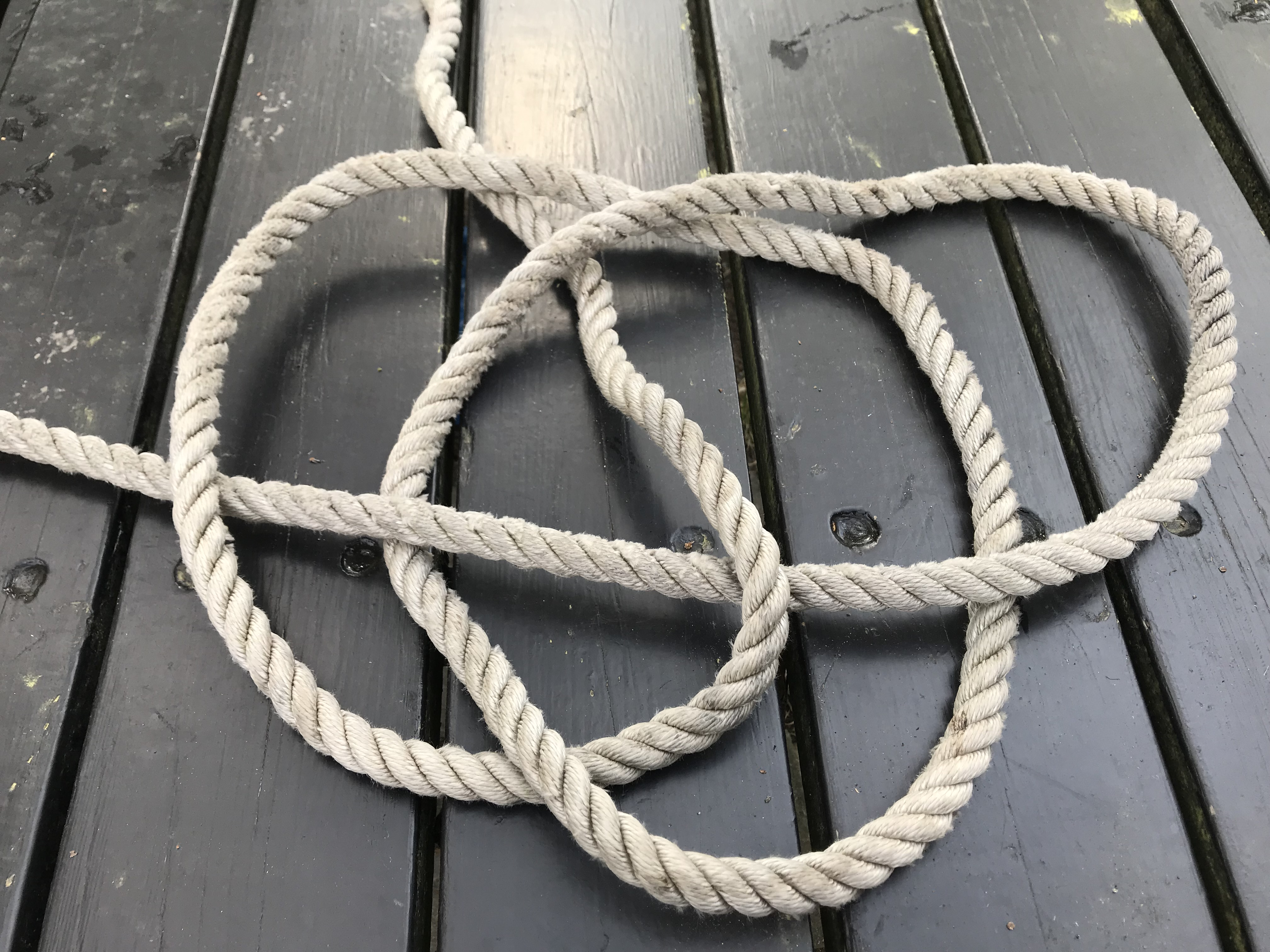
Step three of tying a Celtic Button knot end woven into loops

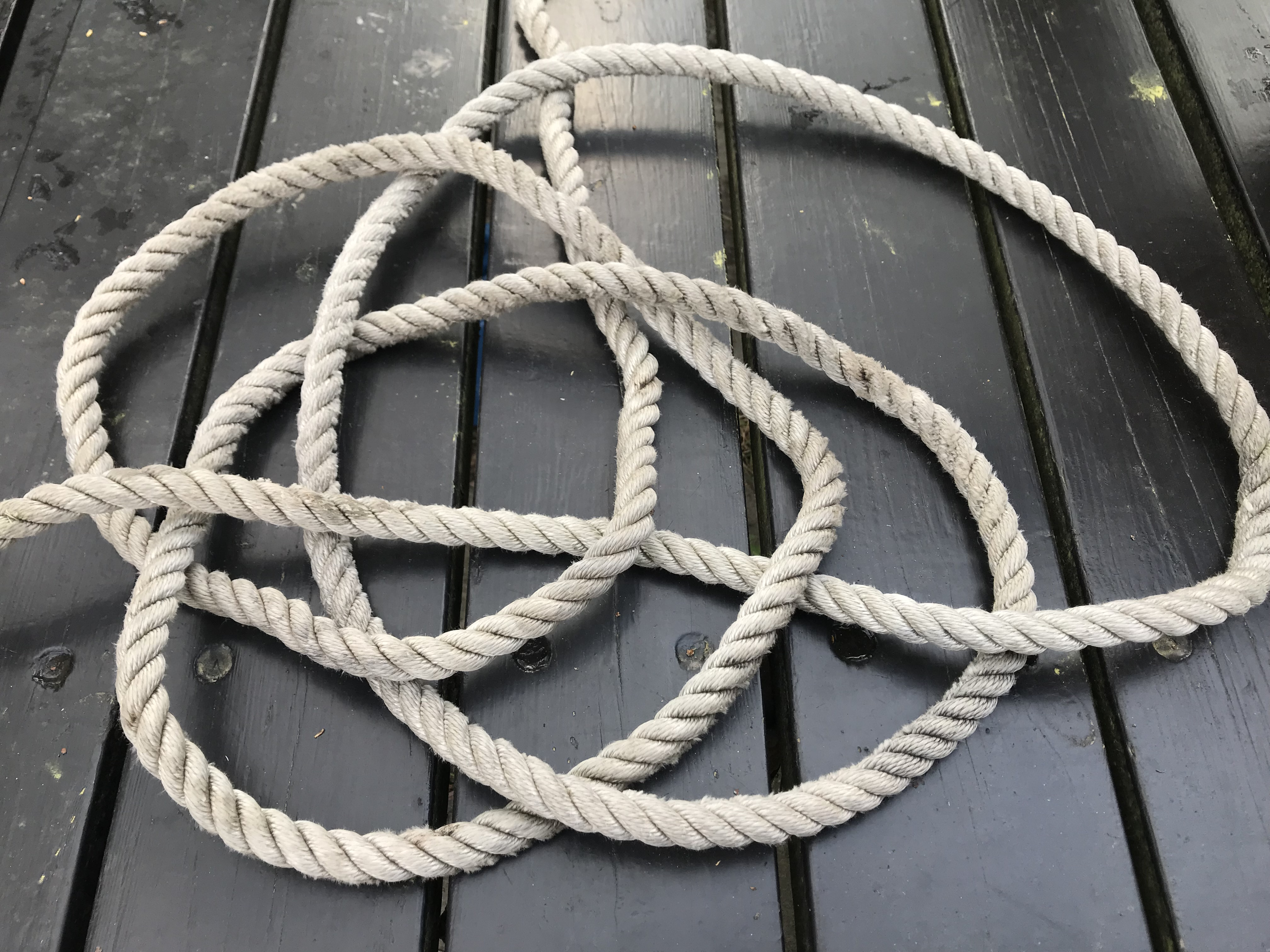
Step four: the end goes over the edge line, and under until the middle

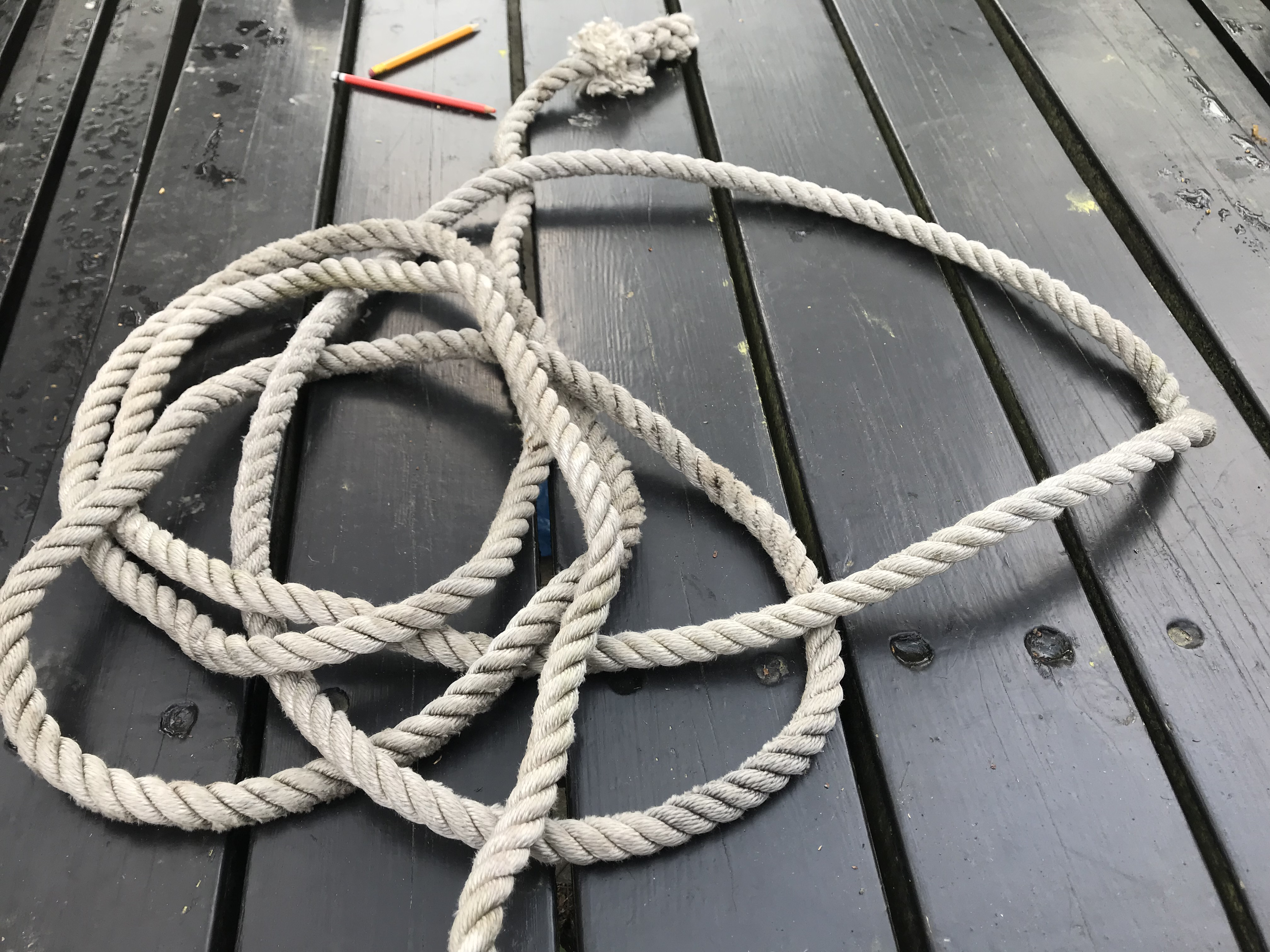
Optional second pass-step one: follow the first pass on the inside

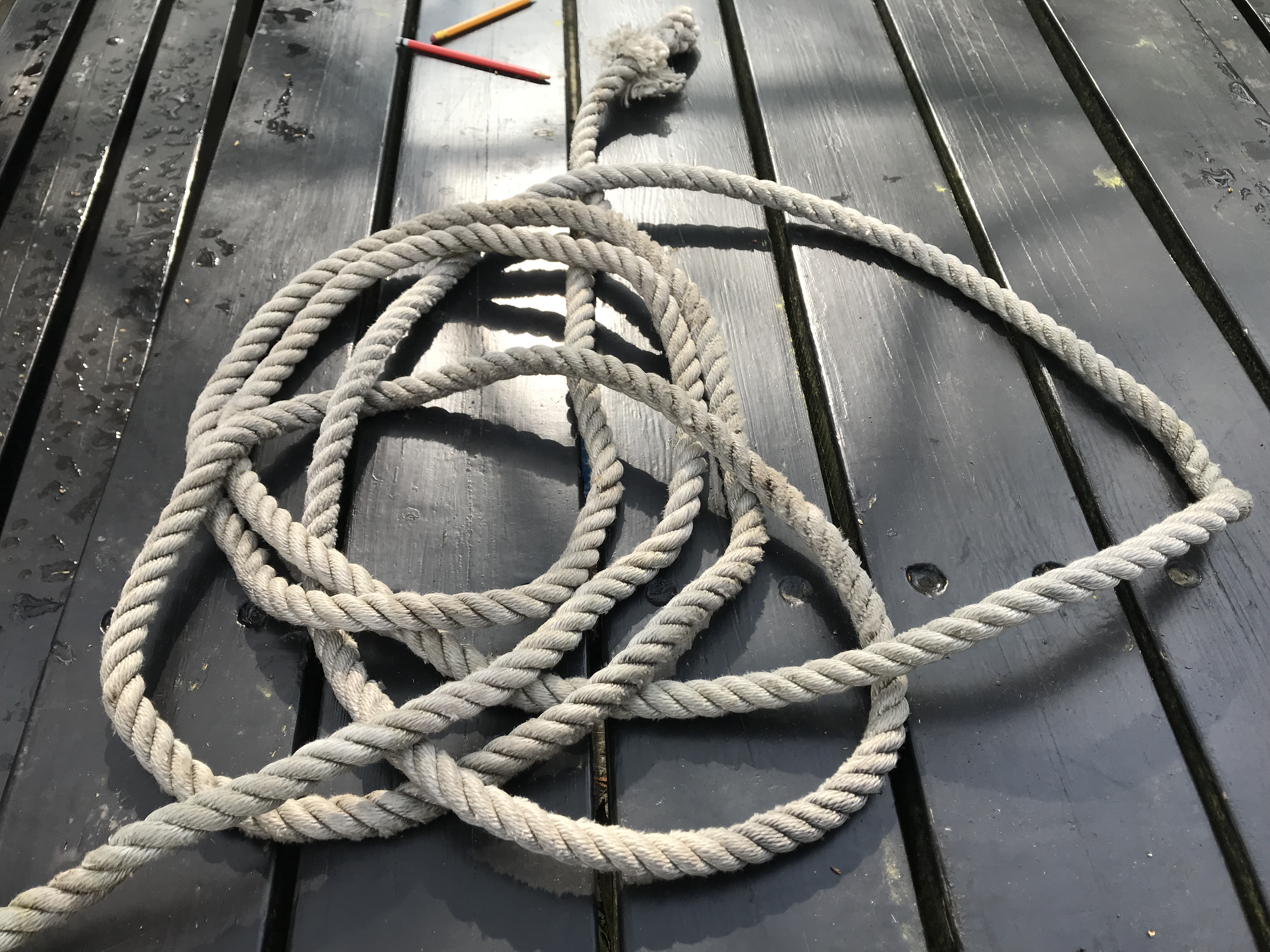
Optional second pass-step two: follow the first pass on the inside

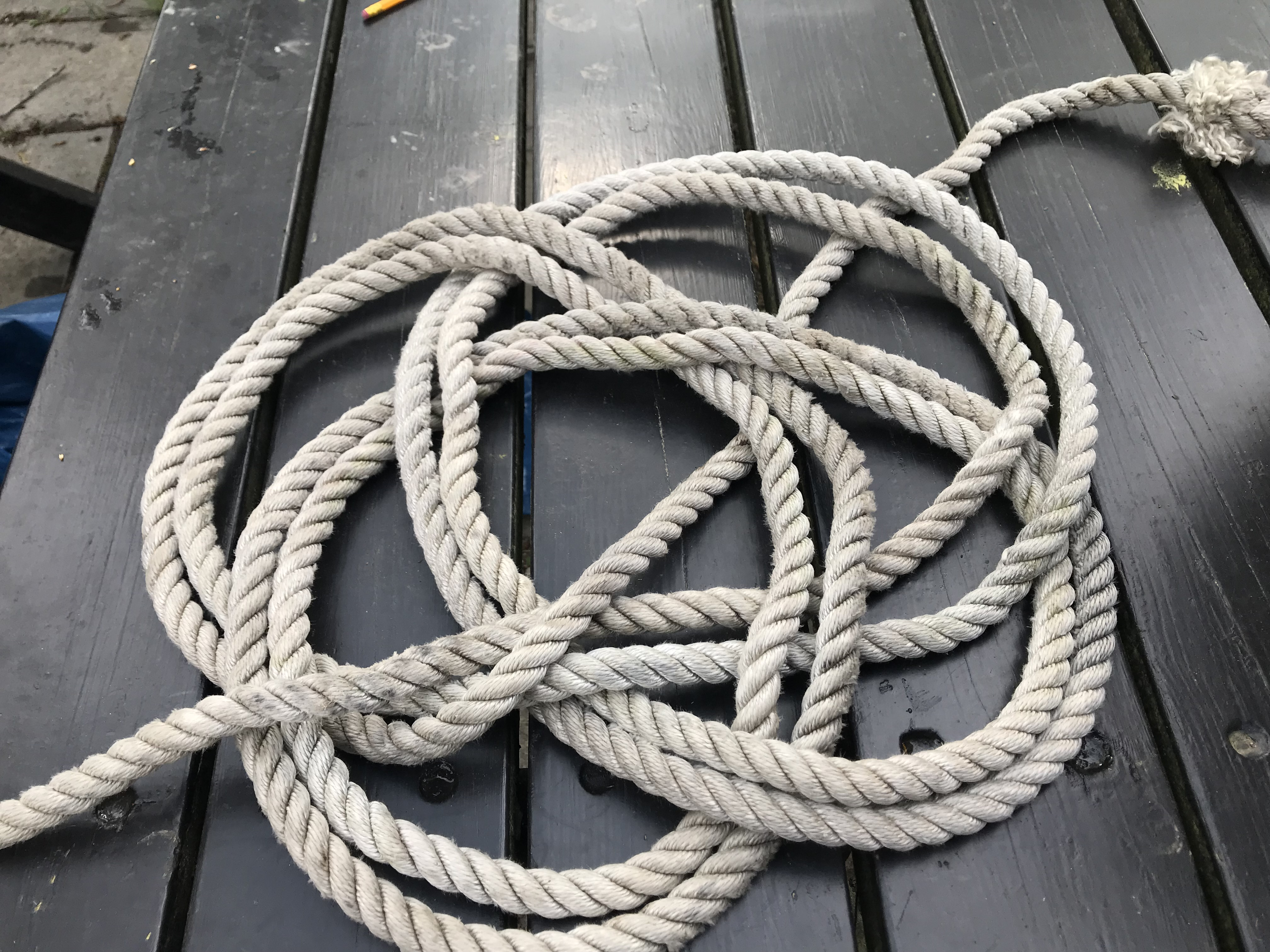
Optional second pass-final step of tying a Celtic Button knot done

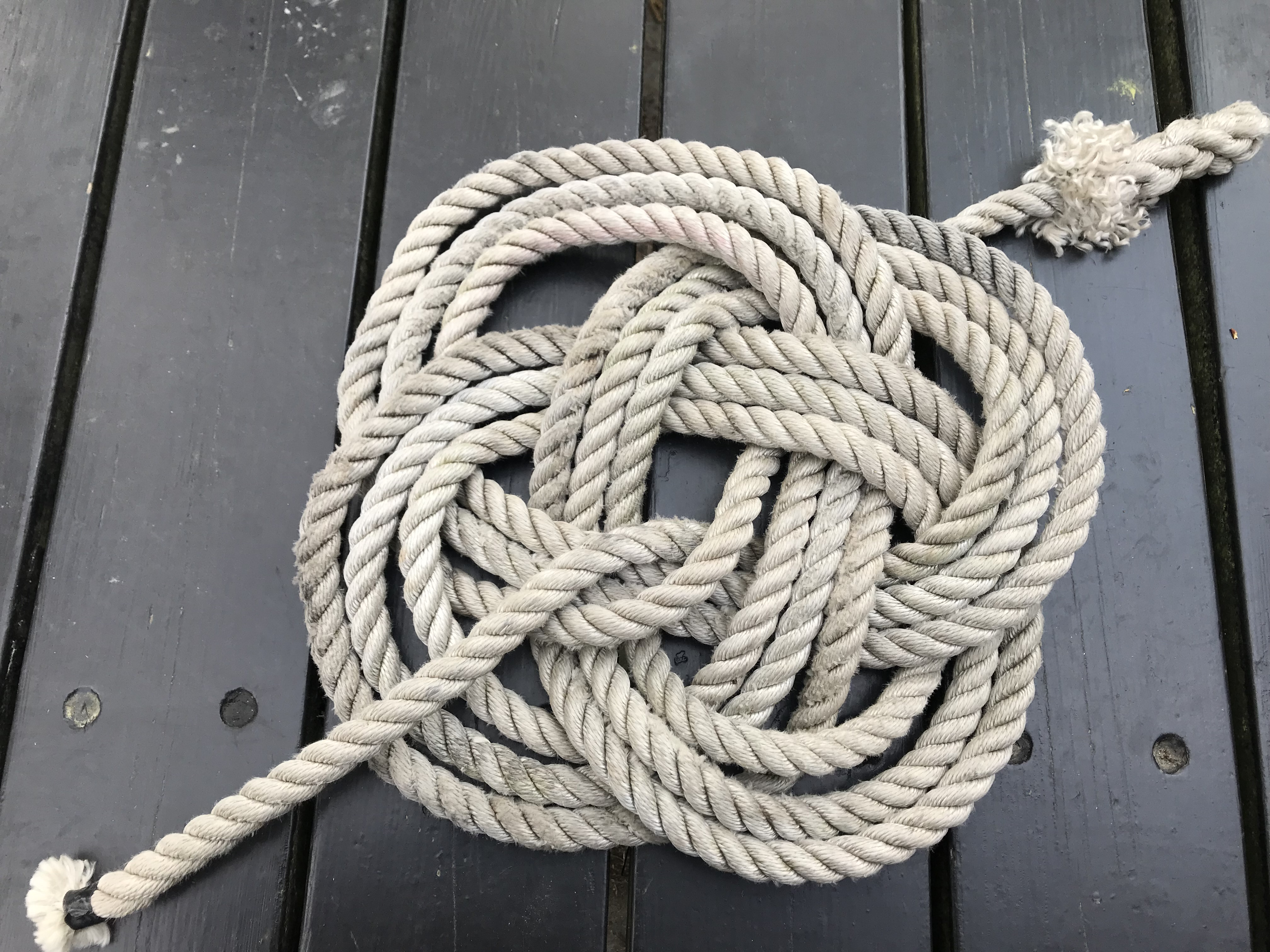
Optional third pass-final step of tying a Celtic Button knot done

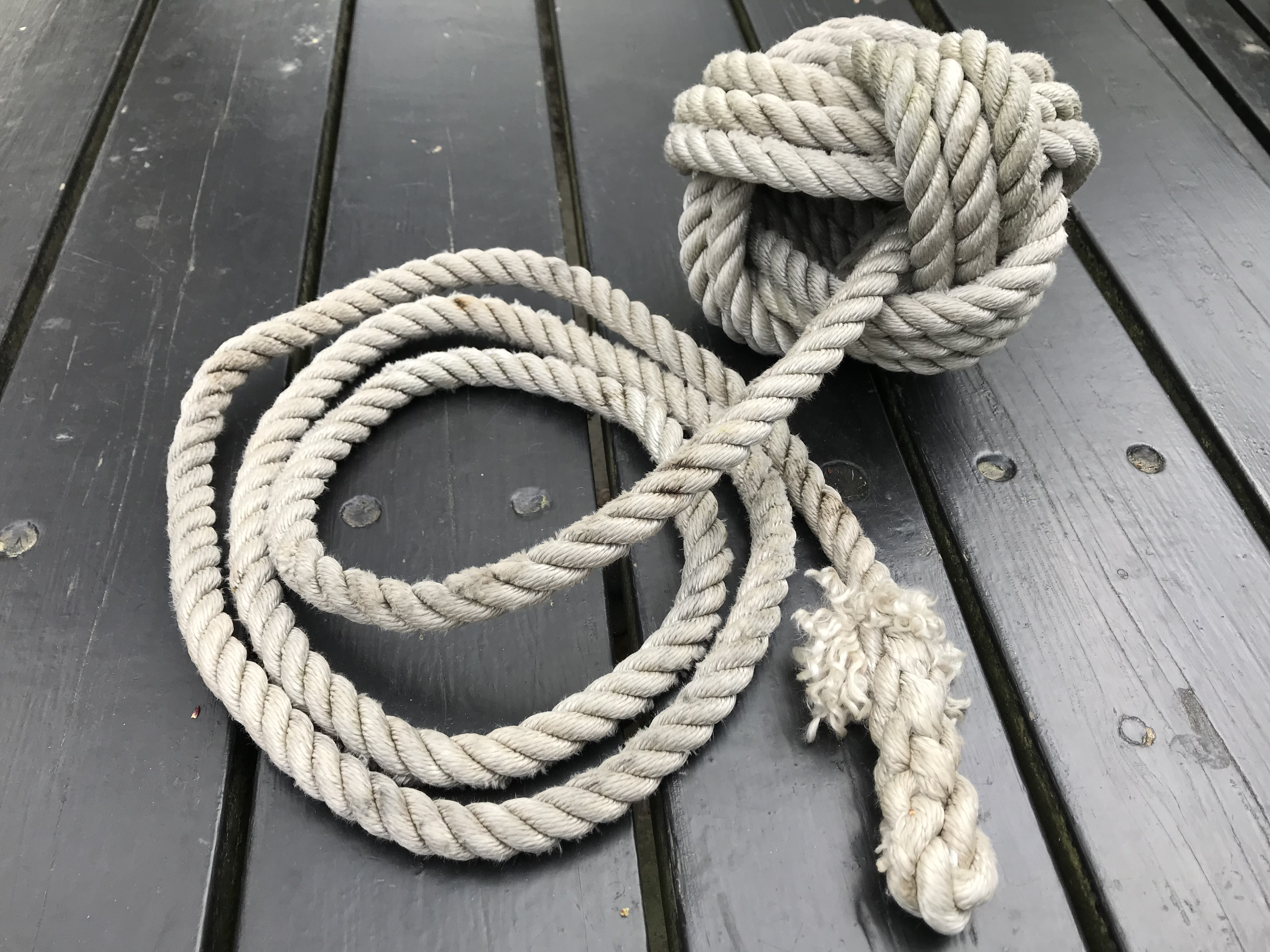
Tightening step of tying a 3 pass Celtic Button knot

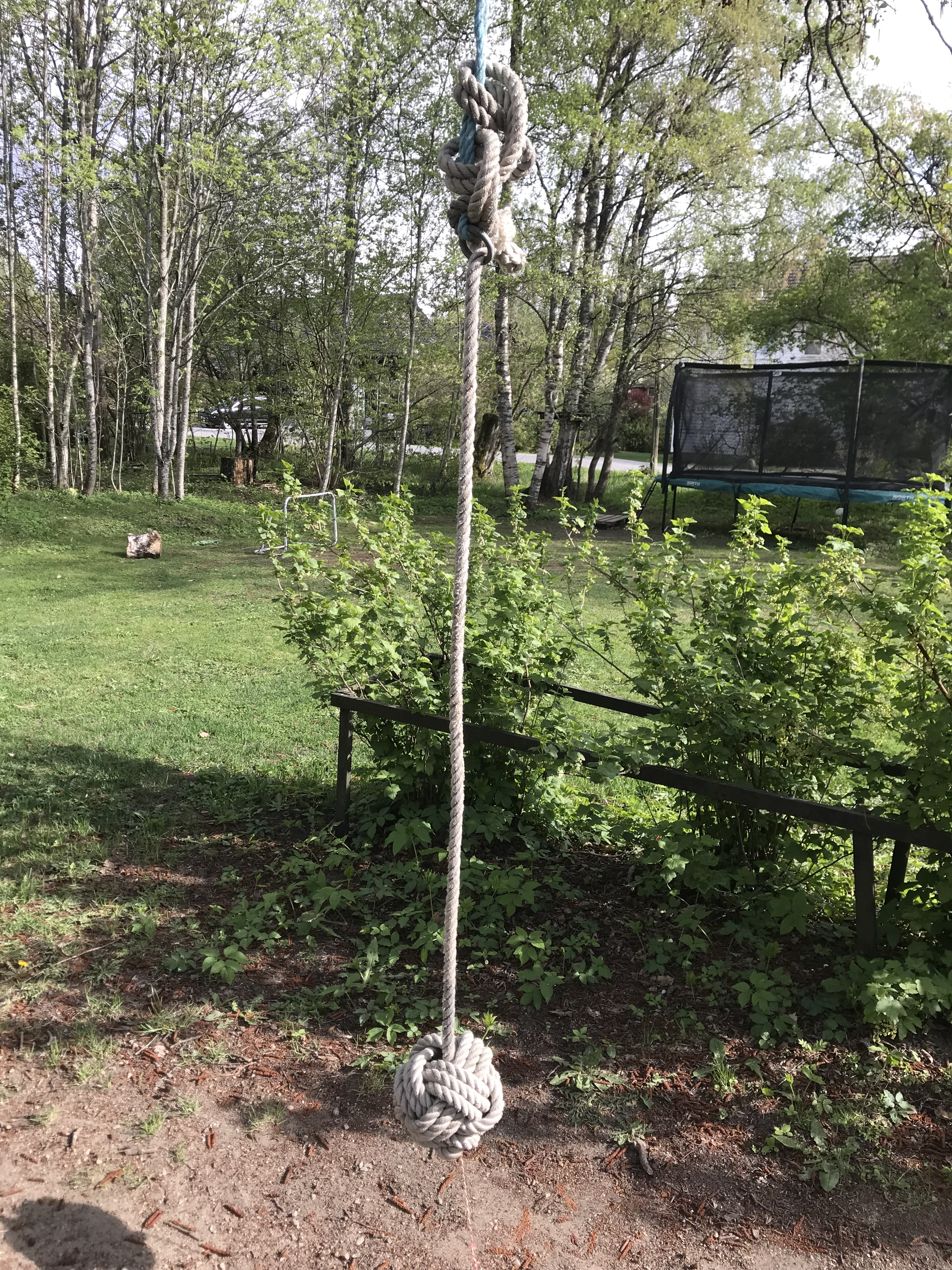
A 3 pass Celtic Button knot as seat of a rope swing

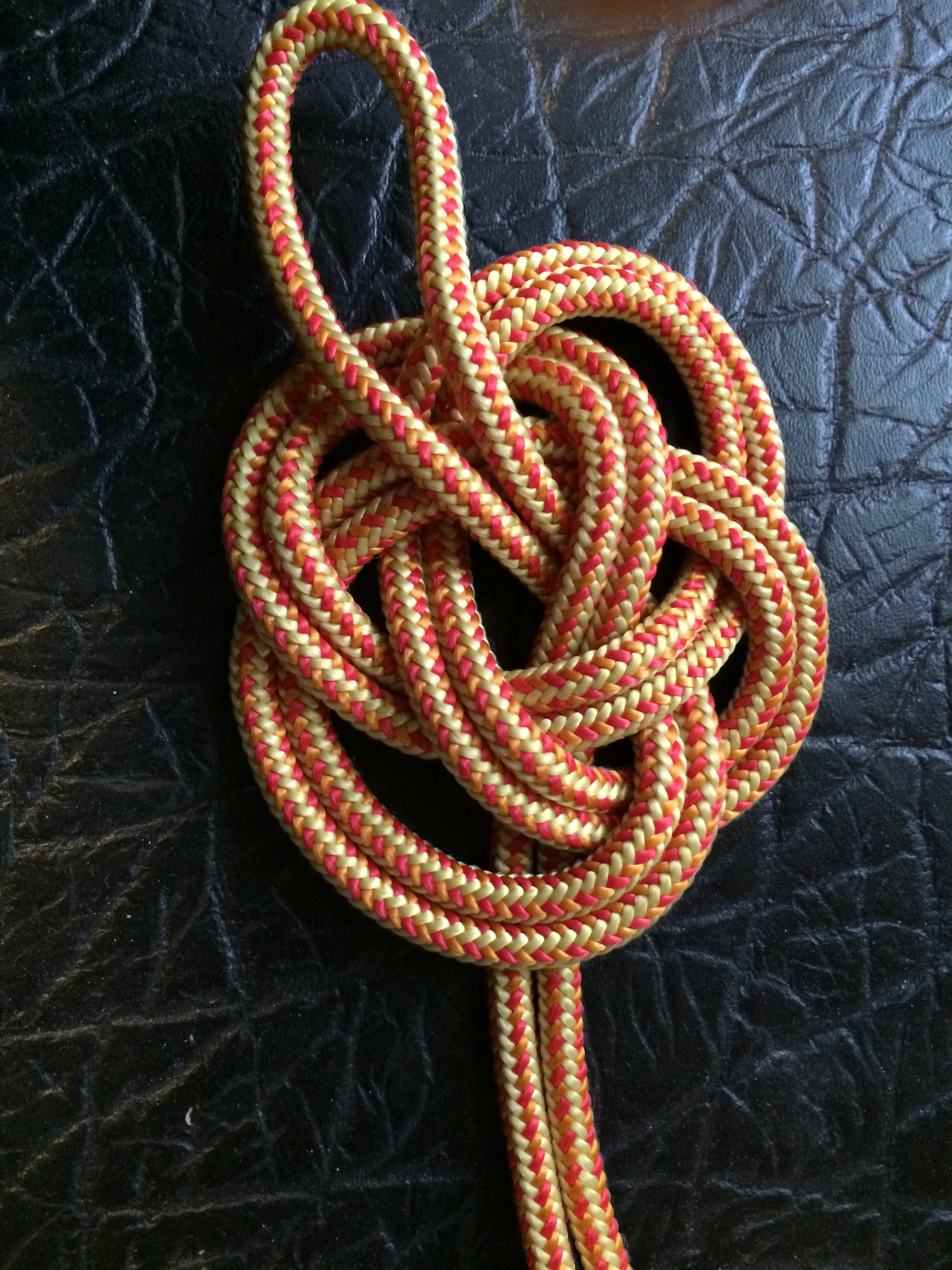
Celtic Button knot on the bight therefore double, flat, with loop

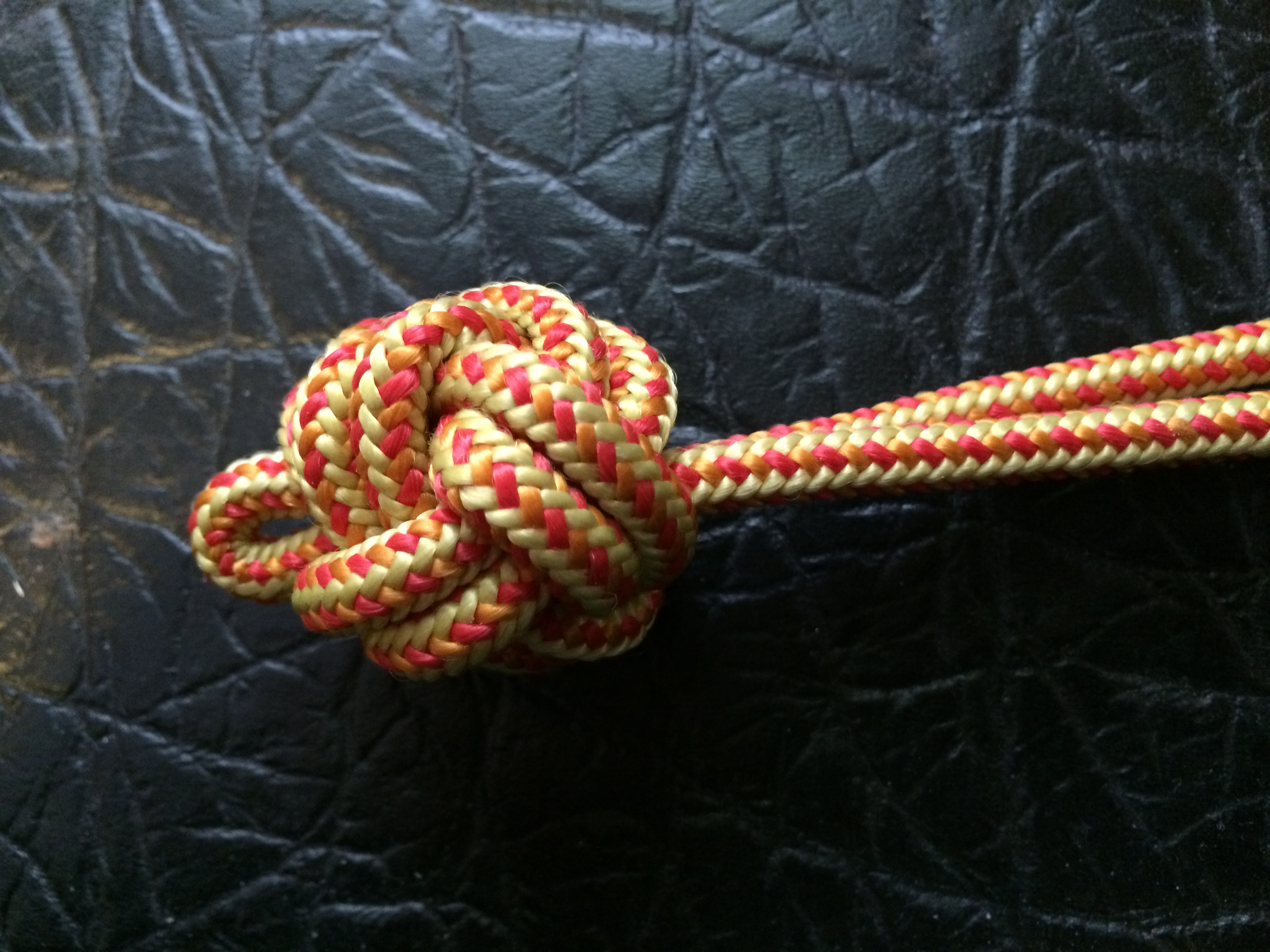
Celtic Button knot on the bight therefore double, tightened, with loop
