= Stopper knot =

Knot that forms a fixed thicker point to prevent unreeving

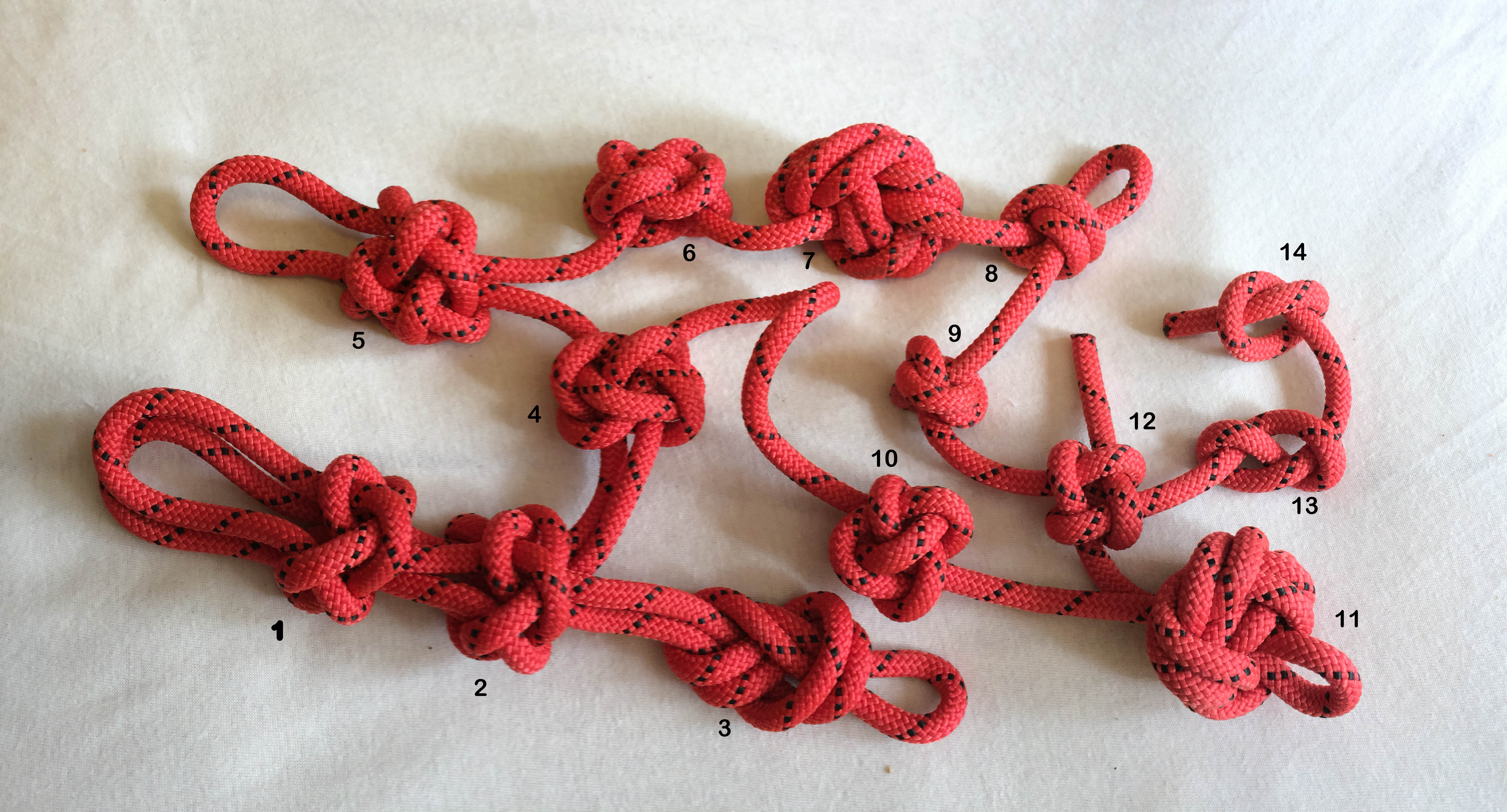
- Names: Stopper knot, Backup knot, As numbered in picture : 1 – Fiador, 2 – Sailor's diamond (#693), 3 – Figure-eight loop, 4 – Diamond, 5 – knife lanyard, 6 – Chinese button, 7 – Chinese button doubled, 8 – True lover's, 9 – Ashley's, 10 – Celtic button, 11 – Celtic button on the bight (and thus doubled and with lanyard loop), 12 – Friendship, 13 – Figure-eight, 14 – Overhand
- Typical use: Keeps the line from slipping out of things.

A stopper knot (or simply stopper) is a knot that creates a fixed thicker point on an otherwise-uniform thickness rope for the purpose of preventing the rope, at that point, from slipping through a narrow passage, such as a hole in a block. To pass a rope through a block, or hole, is to reeve it. To pull it out is to unreeve it. Stopper knots prevent the rope from unreeving on its own. They are also used to lower the chances of rappelling off the end of a rope.

"Stopper" has three distinct meanings in the context of knotting and cordage. A decorative stopper knot may be referred to as a lanyard knot.

The single-strand stopper knot is...[one variety] of knob knots. Generally it is tied as a terminal knot in the end of a rope, where it forms a knob or bunch, the general purpose of which is to prevent unreeving. It is found in the ends of running rigging. It secures the end of a sewing thread; it provides a handhold or a foothold in bell ropes and footropes. It adds weight to the end of a heaving line, and it is often employed decoratively, but it should not be used to prevent unlaying and fraying except in small cord, twine, and the like, as a whipping is in every way preferable for large and valuable material.

— The Ashley Book of Knots

A monkey's tail "is a permanent or semipermanent stopper that is put in the bight as well as the end. It is also called single throat seizing, seized round turn, clinch, and pigtail...A small round turn is first taken, and a throat seizing, in length about a quarter of the round of the clinch, is put in. The monkey's tail is preferred for the purpose just described because it does less damage to rope than any knot. When the monkey's tail fetches against the rack the seizing takes the burden."

== At the end of a line ==
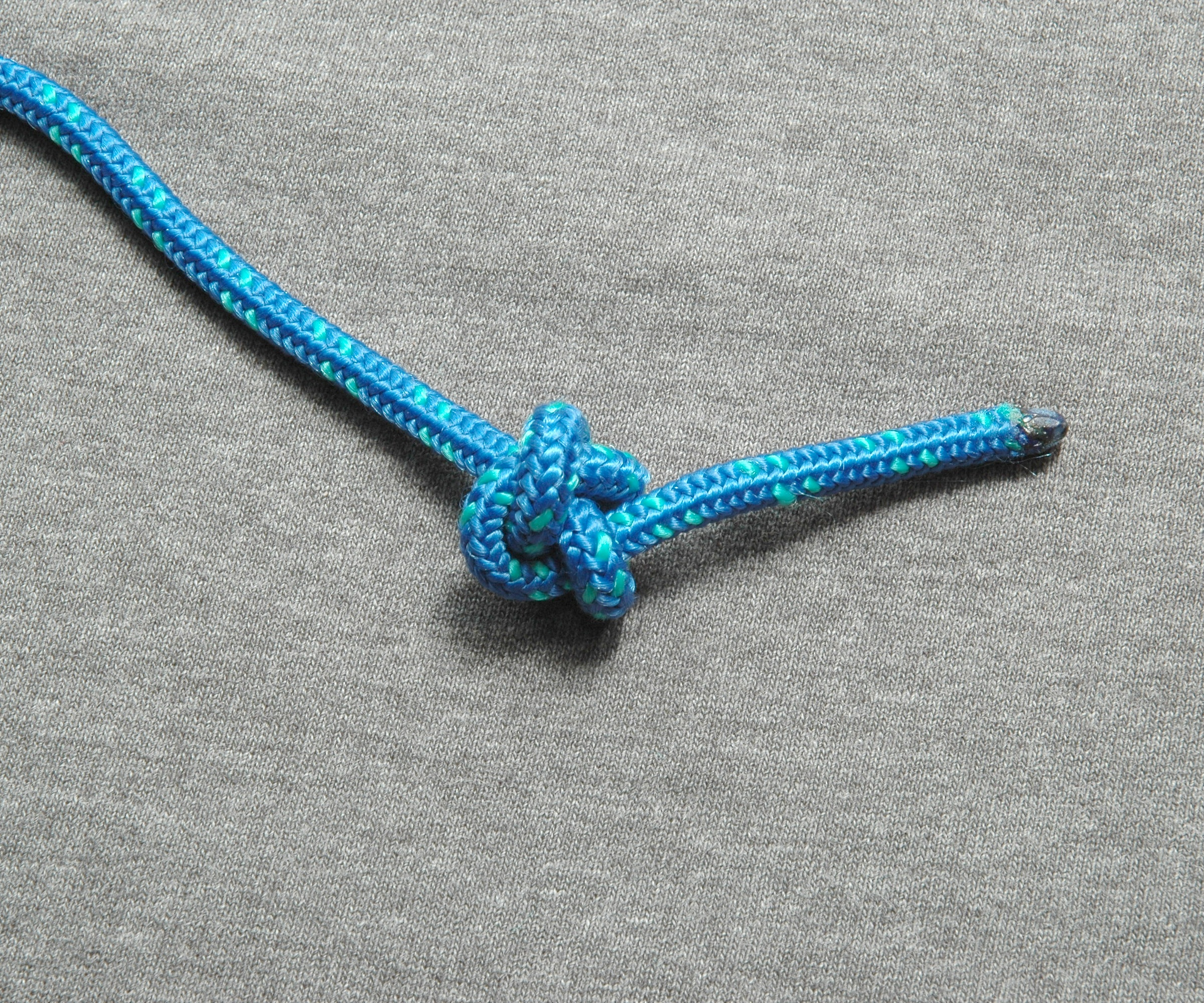
An Ashley stopper knot at the end of a line

A stopper knot is tied at the end of a rope to prevent the end from unraveling. It then functions like a whipping knot.

A stopper knot is tied at the end of a rope to prevent the end from slipping through another knot, or passing back through a hole, block, or belay/rappel device. It then functions like a leash handle. Knots commonly used for this purpose are:

- Overhand knot
- Double overhand knot
- Figure-eight knot
- Stevedore knot
- Ashley's stopper knot

The Chinese button knot and the Celtic button knot are decorative stopper knots.

== Around the standing part ==
When a stopper knot is tied outside another knot and around the standing part it can also be called a backup knot. Tying the end around the standing part helps prevent the knot from unraveling by not allowing the end to slide back into the knot: a kind of insurance against failure of the knot. Examples of this usage are often seen in climbing, rope rescue, and other safety-of-life situations. Common knots used for this purpose are:

- Overhand knot
- Double overhand knot/strangle knot
- Double fisherman's knot

== Nautical usage ==
In nautical settings, a stopper may refer to a length of rope that is belayed at one end with the other end attached to a tensioned main line using a friction hitch in order to tension the stopper and thereby slacken the portion of the tensioned main line behind the friction hitch. For example, if a sheet becomes jammed on a winch while under sail, a "stopper" can be used to temporarily take the strain off the winch while the riding turn is cleared.

- Rolling hitch & similar friction hitches

== See also ==
- Binding knot – Knot used to keep objects together
- Reef knot – Common binding knot
- Underwriter's knot – Knot used in electrical wiring
- Monkey's fist – Knot to weight the end of a rope
