= Ashley's stopper knot =

Type of knot

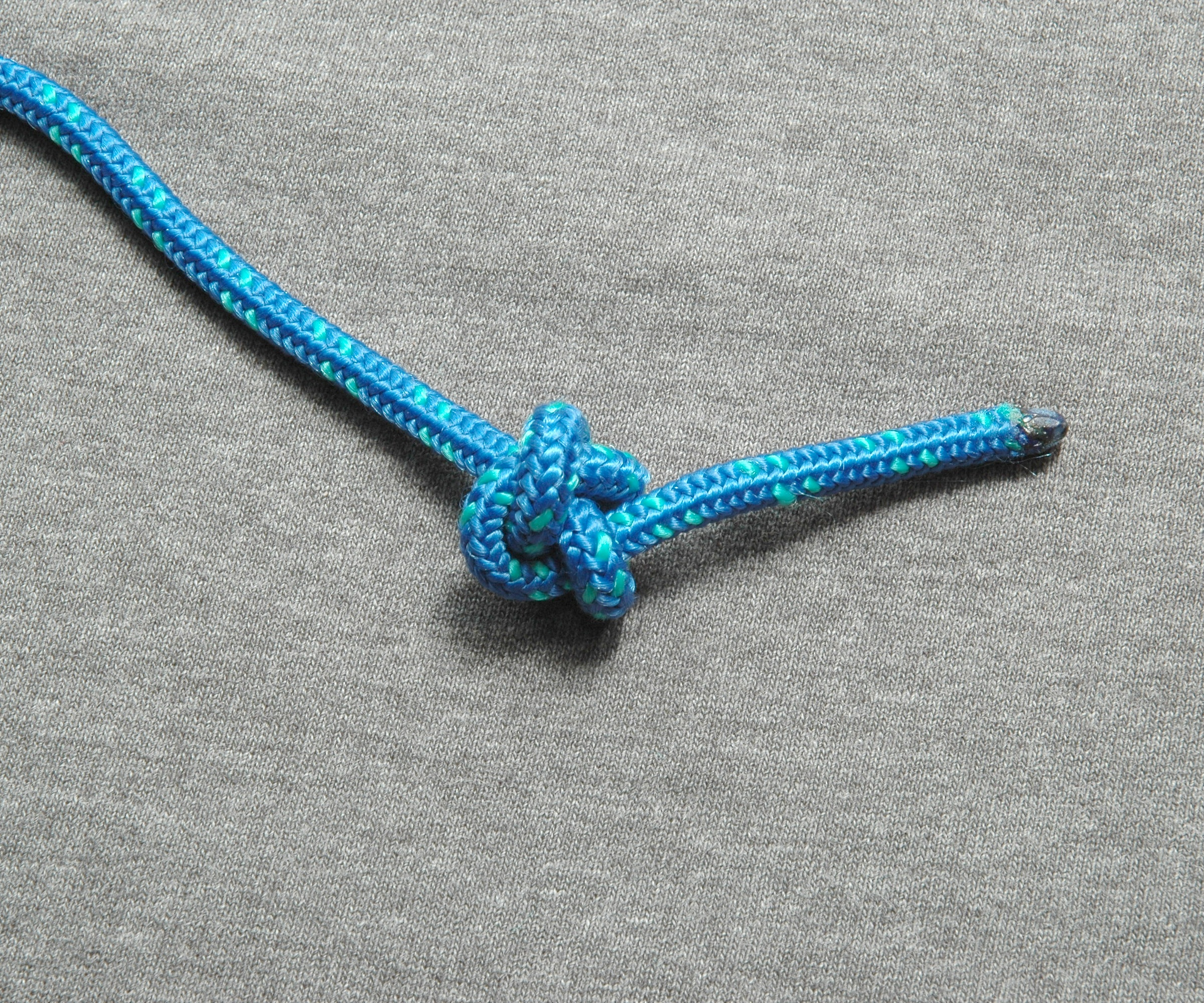
- Names: Ashley's stopper knot, Ashley stopper knot, Oysterman's stopper
- Category: Stopper
- Origin: Clifford Ashley, c. 1910
- ABoK: #526
- A/B notation: 8_{20}

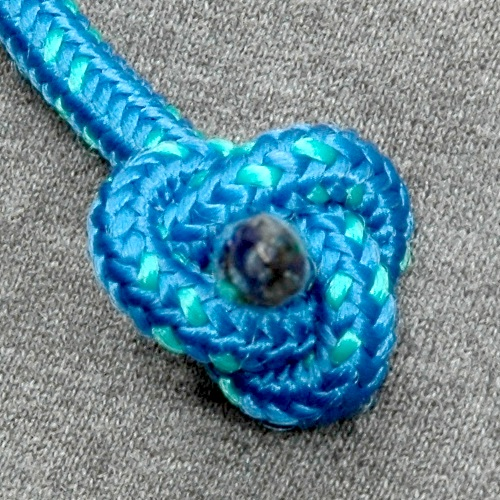
The load-bearing face of an Ashley's stopper knot. This particular example was tied in an unusual manner, with what would normally be considered the "standing part" very short, to fully expose the knot's Trefoil-like face.

Ashley's stopper knot, also known as the oysterman's stopper, is a knot developed by Clifford W. Ashley around 1910. It makes a well-balanced trefoil-faced stopper at the end of the rope, giving greater resistance to pulling through an opening than other common stoppers. Essentially, the knot is a common overhand noose, but with the end of the rope passing through the noose eye, which closes upon it. It may be multiplied to form a larger knot with more than three bights appearing around the knot. It is the result of implementing a double wall knot in one strand.

Ashley developed this knot in trying to duplicate a knot he saw on a boat in a local oyster fishing fleet. When he had a chance to observe the knot up close at a later time he realized it was just a badly water-swollen figure eight stopper knot.

The oysterman's stopper...It is a larger knot than the figure-eight, which has but one part around the stem. The oysterman's stopper knot has three rim parts, and these are quite symmetrical when viewed from the underside. From this view it closely resembles a three-strand wall knot. The end is nipped by a single top part. It is easy to tie and practical to use when the hole that is to be filled is too large for the figure-eight.

— The Ashley Book of Knots

== Tying ==
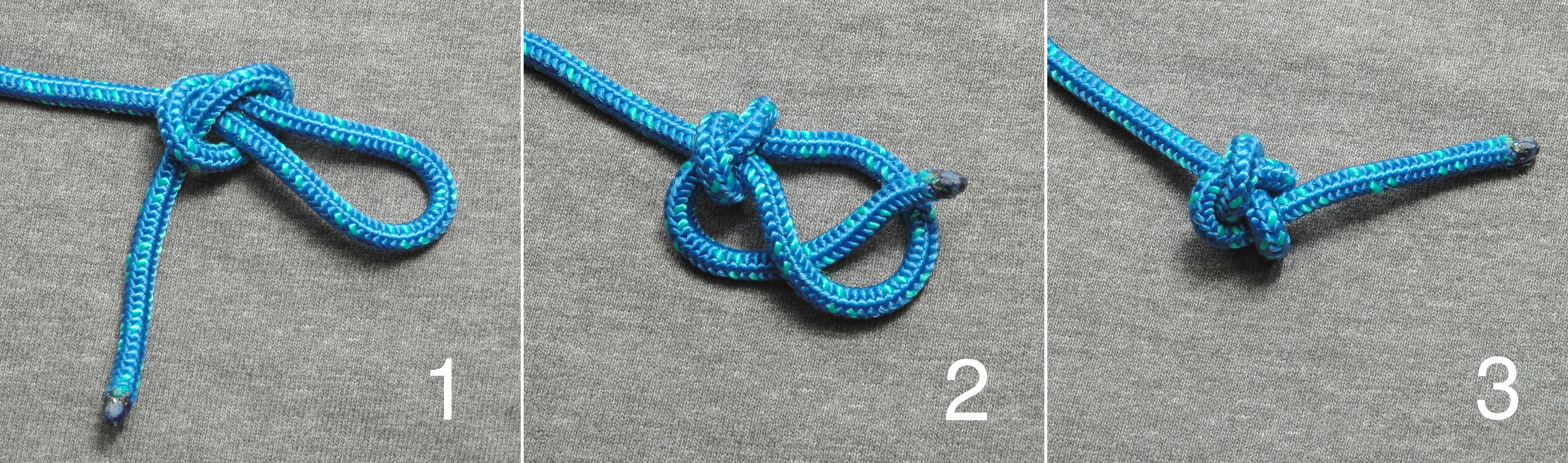

1. Form an overhand noose, or simply tie an overhand knot around the standing part as shown.
2. Tighten the overhand portion of the knot around the standing part. Thread the working part through the loop.
3. First close the noose on the working part by pulling on the standing part, then remove any remaining slack in the knot by pulling on the working part. The knot should have a tidy, triangular shape where the standing part enters the knot. (See image at right.)

== See also ==
- List of knots
