= Decorative knot =

Type of knot

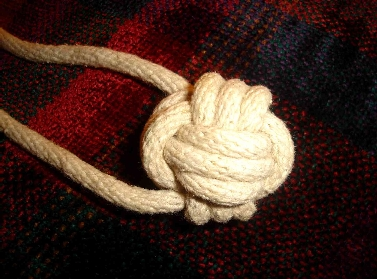
Monkey's fist knot

A decorative or ornamental knot (also fancy knot) is an often complex knot exhibiting repeating patterns. A decorative knot is generally a knot that not only has practical use but is also known for its aesthetic or ornamental qualities. Often originating from maritime use, "decorative knots are not only serviceable and functional but also enhance the ship-shape appearance of any vessel." Decorative knots may be used alone or in combination, and may consist of single or multiple strands.

Though the word decorative sometimes implies that little or no function is served, the craft of decorative knot tying generally combines both form and function.

Coxcombing is decorative knotwork performed by sailors during the Age of Sail to dress-up, protect, or help identify specific items and parts of ships and boats.

== List ==
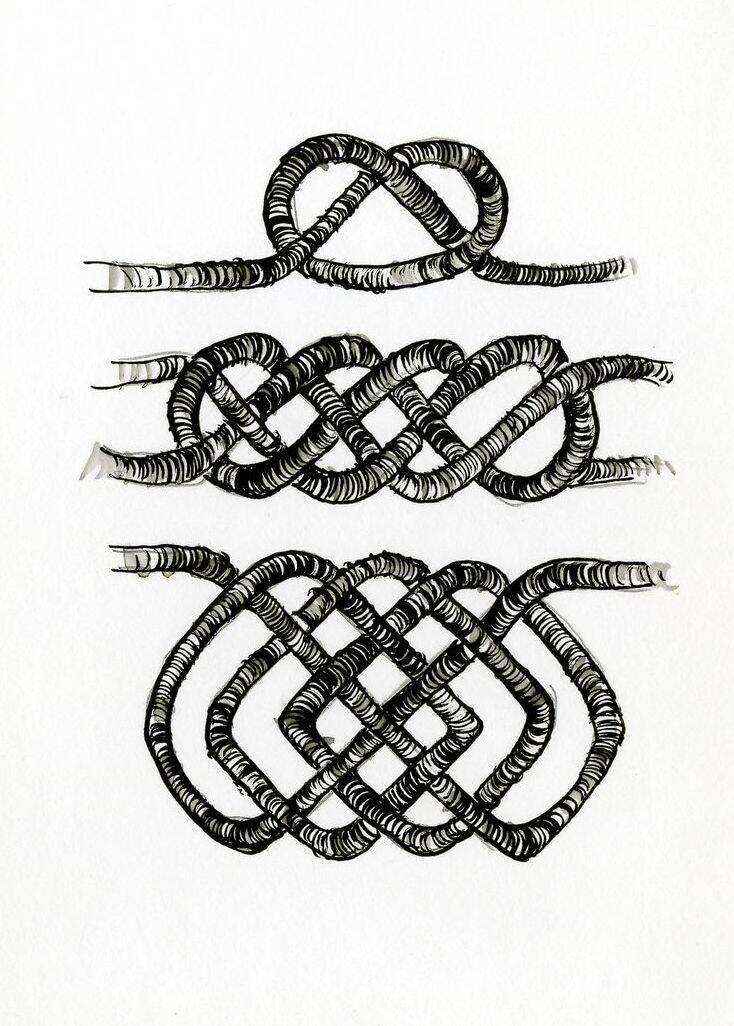
Some decorative knots

This is an alphabetical list of decorative knots.

- Austrian knots
- Aztec button knot
- Bruce knot
- Carrick mat
- Catherine knot
- Celtic knotting
- Chinese button knot
- Diamond knot
- Discipline (King Crimson album) knotwork (Discipline Global Mobile logo)
- Endless knot (unknot)
- Eternity knot
- Fan knot
- Fiador knot
- Flat mat knot
- Flores button knot
- Friendship knot
- Gaucho knot
- Ginfer knot
- Globe knot
- Headhunter's knot
- Heel knot
- Heraldic knot
  - Bourchier knot
  - Bowen knot (unknot)
  - Dacre knot (unknot)
  - Hinckaert knot
  - Hungerford knot
  - Wake knot
- Herringbone knot
- Interlace (visual arts)
- Lone star knot
- Matthew Walker knot
- Monkey's fist knot
- Pan Chang knot
- Pampas button knot
- Pineapple knot
- Prolong knot
- Savoy knot
- Sennit
- Shamrock knot (an arrangement of True lover's knot)
- Solomon's knot
- Spanish ring knot
- Stafford knot
- Turk's head knot
- Valknut
- Wall and crown knot

== See also ==
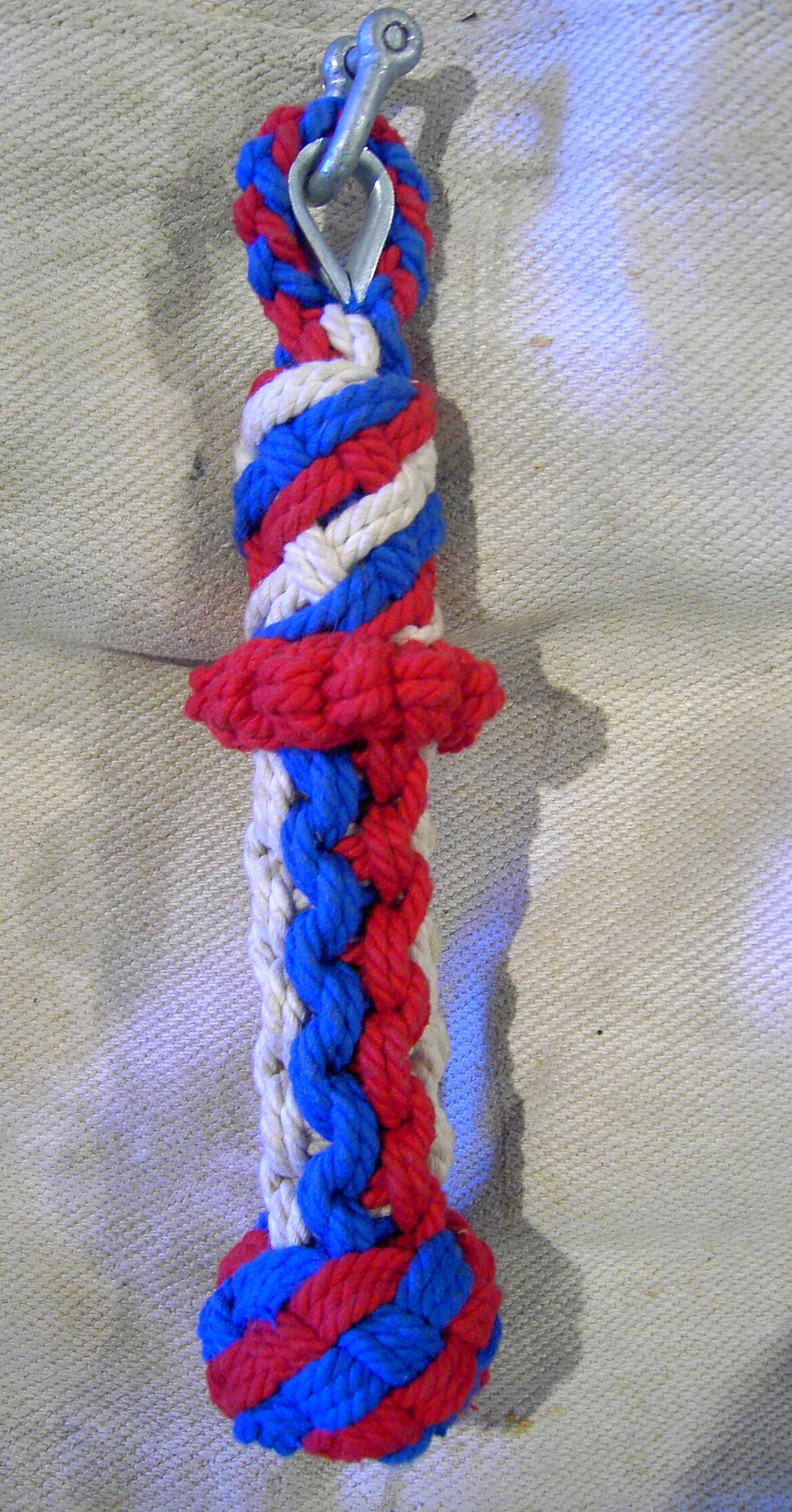
Bellrope

- List of knots
- Knotted stitch
- Plait (Braid)
- Garland
- Japanese glass fishing float (for knotwork)
- Bell pull
- Necktie
  - Windsor knot
- Bow tie
- Lace
- Lanyard
- Macramé
- Scoubidou
- Shoelaces
- Silk knots (fabric cufflinks)
- String figure
- Wedding cord/Handfasting
