= Bowen knot =

Heraldic knot

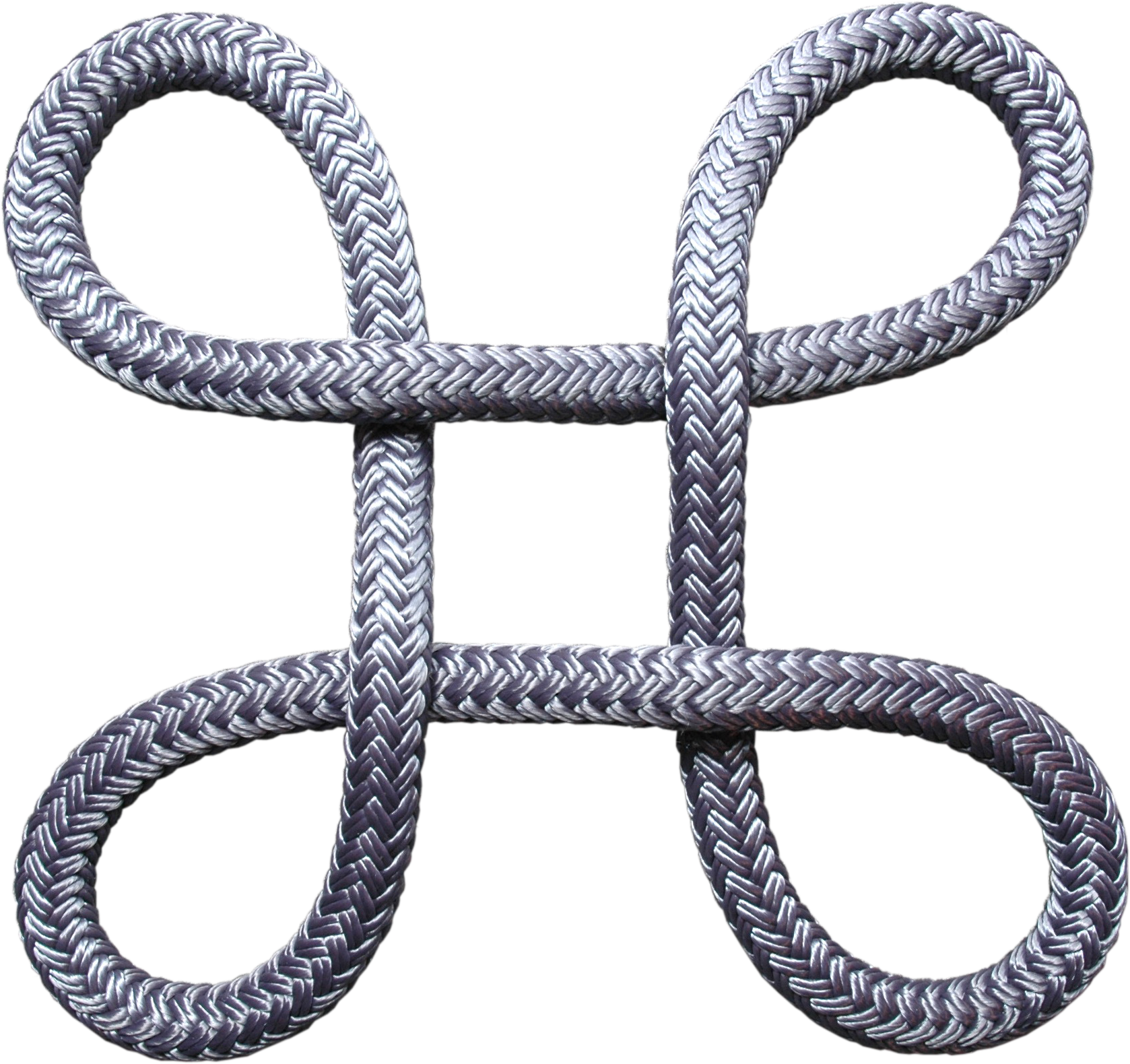

Information
- Family: Bowen Family
- Region: Wales

The Bowen knot is an unknot design used as a heraldic charge. It is named after the Welshman James Bowen (died 1629) and is also called the true lover's knot. It consists of a rope in the form of a continuous loop laid out as an upright square shape with loops at each of the four corners. Since the design readily unwinds to an ordinary loop, it is not a proper topological knot.

In Norwegian heraldry, a Bowen knot is called a valknute (valknut), and the municipal coat of arms of Lødingen Municipality used since 1984 has a femsløyfet valknute, which means a Bowen knot with five loops.

An angular Bowen knot is such a knot with no rounded sides so that it appears to be made of five squares. A Bowen knot with lozenge-shaped loops is called a bendwise Bowen knot or a Bowen cross.

The Dacre, Hungerford, Lacy, Shakespeare and Tristram knots are all considered variations of the Bowen knot and are sometimes blazoned as such.

The Bowen knot resembles the symbol ⌘ (looped square), which is used on Apple keyboards as the symbol of the Command key. However, the origin of this use is not related to the use of the Bowen knot in heraldic designs.

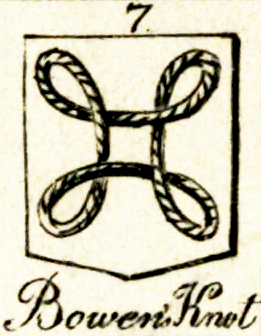
Bowen knot in a book from 1827

Angular Bowen knot

Bowen cross

Arms of the Norwegian municipality Lødingen

Schildknoten

Totem sign as a symbol of the ancient culture of the region in the coat of arms of Kostomuksha, Russia

Fensterrautenkreuz

Coat of arms from Hausgereut (Rheinau, Baden): Hausmarke with triangles instead of loops

== Sources ==
- "Lord Kyl's Heraldry – Glossary – Bo... – Entry: Bowen's Knot". Lord Padraig MacKay of Kyle. Archived from the original on 2008-10-15.
- Heraldic Templates — Knots.

== See also ==
- Endless knot
