= Matthew Walker knot =

Knot, useful to keep the end of the rope from fraying

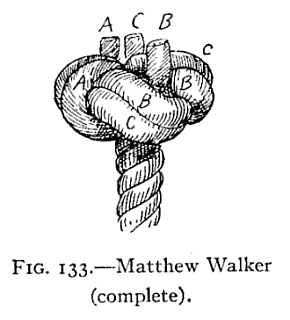
- Category: Decorative
- ABoK: 678
- Instructions

A Matthew Walker knot is a decorative knot that is used to keep the end of a rope from fraying. It is tied by unraveling the strands of a twisted rope, knotting the strands together, then laying up the strands together again. It may also be tied using several separate cords, in which case it keeps the cords together in a bundle. The traditional use of the knot is to form a knob or "stopper" to prevent the end of the rope from passing through a hole, for instance in rigging the lanyards which tension the shrouds on older sailing ships with standing rigging of fibre cordage.

It is not specifically known who Matthew Walker was, nor why this knot was named after him. However, early references from the 19th century suggest he may have been a ship's rigger in the Royal Navy.

The following quote from The Ashley Book of Knots gives possible origins of the knot:

The FULL or DOUBLE MATTHEW WALKER KNOT.

Lever in 1808 speaks of "MATTHEW WALKER'S KNOT" and describes the knot which Alston in 1860 calls the "DOUBLE MATTHEW WALKER KNOT." A refinement of the original knot had in the meantime taken over the original name, which is now generally modified to "a MATTHEW WALKER".

Lever's familiar expression, "MATTHEW WALKER'S KNOT," suggests that he may have known the inventor, who was possibly a master rigger in one of the British naval dockyards. Many myths have grown up around Matthew Walker, "the only man ever to have a knot named for him." Dr. Frederic Lucas, of the American Museum of Natural History, once told me the following story of the Origin of the knot, which he had heard off the Chincha Islands while loading guano in 1869.

A sailor, having been sentenced to death by a judge who in earlier life had been a sailor himself, was reprieved by the judge because of their common fellowship of the sea. The judge offered the sailor a full pardon if he could show him a knot that he, the judge, could neither tie nor untie.

The sailor called for ten fathoms of rope and, having retired to the privacy of his cell, unlaid the rope halfway, put in a MATTHEW WALKER KNOT, and then laid up the rope again to the end.

So Matthew Walker secured his pardon, and the world gained an excellent knot.

This knot is highly decorative, and was historically one of the most common and important knots. On a modern yacht, it is almost unused and unknown.

It has been used in making stopper knots where lariats are used.

== How to tie ==
A Matthew Walker knot is tied in a circular bundle of any number of strands. To tie the knot, the tier takes each strand and forms a loop around the rest of the bundle, then passes the end through the newly formed loop to form an overhand knot. They then move to the next strand over, moving around the bundle in the direction they pass the loops. Tying the first strand around the bundle is straightforward, but each subsequent end must be passed through the previously-formed loops in order to contain all of the other strands in its loop. When tightening, it may help to roll the knot along the bundle, especially when using only two strands. The final effect is a spiral knot vaguely resembling a section of a barber's pole.

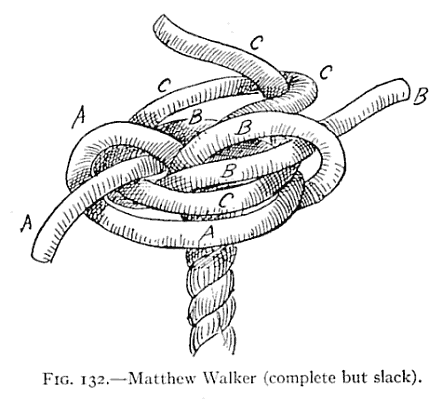

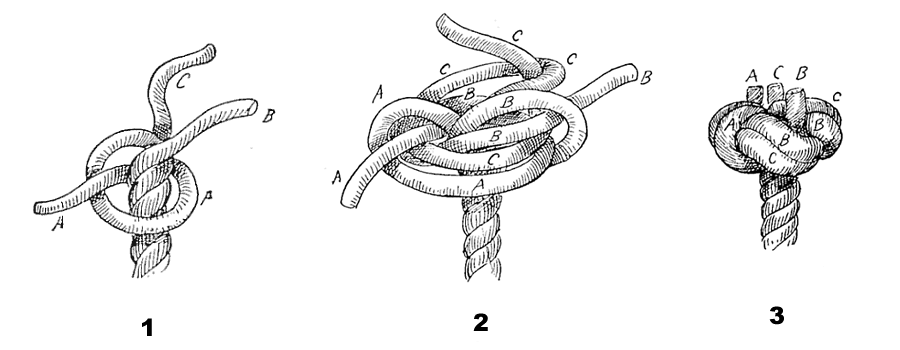

== See also ==
- List of knots

== Knob knots ==
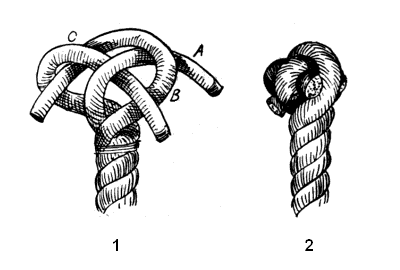
Crown knot

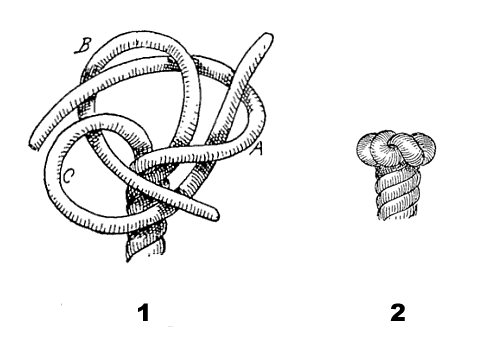
Wall knot

Wall and crown knot

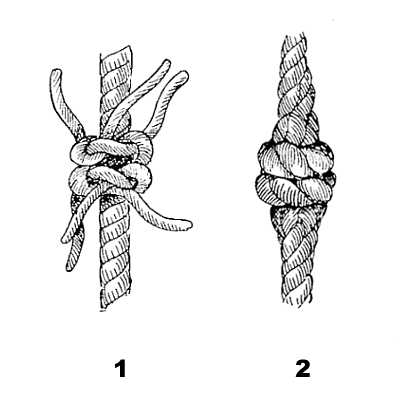
Shroud knot

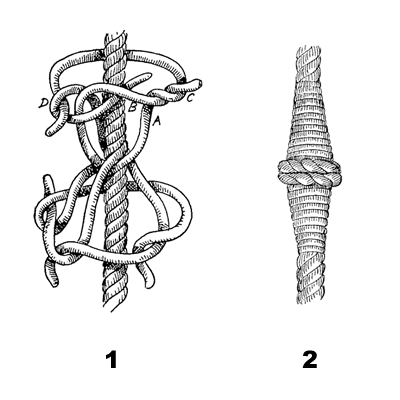
French shroud

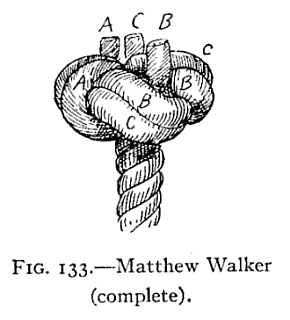
Matthew Walker knot

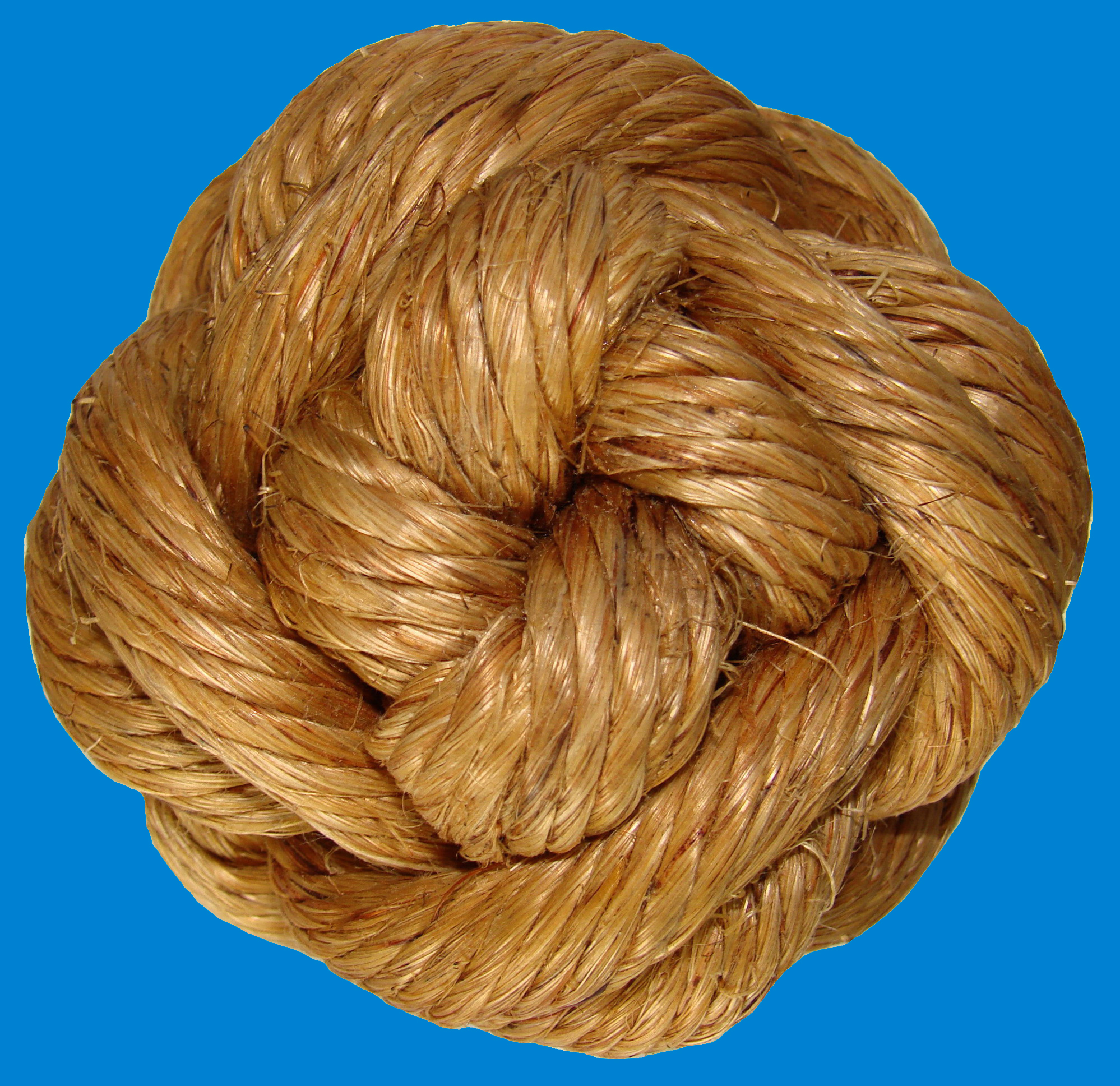
Rose knot

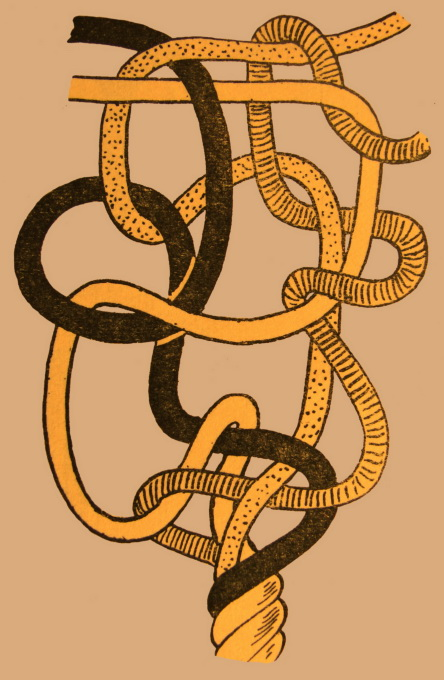
tying of Rose knot
