= St. John's Cross =

St. John's Cross may refer to:

- the Maltese Cross, the symbol of the Order of Saint John and the Venerable Order of St John
- in heraldry, a charge similar to the cross pattée, but with straight parallel lines at the centre and trapeziform widenings at the ends
- the symbol “⌘” (Looped square, in analogy to its name in Scandinavian languages like Danish Johanneskors)
