= Wall and crown knot =

Type of rope button

- Names: Wall and crown knot, Manrope knot
- Category: Decorative
- Related: Turk's head knot, Underwriter's knot
- ABoK: #672, #847
- Instructions

A wall and crown knot is a decorative kind of rope button. The original use of the knot was to put at the end of the ropes on either side of a gangway leading onto a ship as stoppers.

The knot consists of a wall knot and a crown knot with doubled strands. The strands of the wall knot go over, under twice, and over, while the strands of the crown knot go under, over twice, and under. In the wall and crown knot they are tied in opposite directions.

This knot is often confused with a Turk's head knot, as both knots have a basket weave pattern.

A Manrope knot (double wall and crown, #847) is the same knot as wall and crown knot, but with little changes - crown strands doubled or tripled. In Verrill's book it is made from three-strand and crown strands doubled, in Ashley's book it is made from four-strand and crown strands tripled.

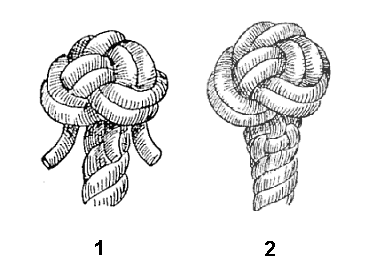
Double wall and crown

== Crown knot ==
Crown knot
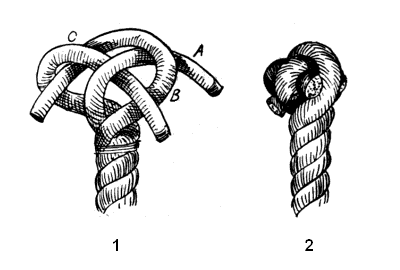
- Names: Crown knot, single crown, three strand crown
- Category: Decorative
- ABoK: 670

A crown knot is the simplest of the fancy knots. It is created from three strands.

670. "Crowning" is mentioned by Steel in 1794. The Vocabulary of Sea Phrases of 1799 gives both the crown and the double crown...To tie a three-strand crown: Hold the apparatus as in the right upper diagram, and tie the knot in a counterclockwise direction. Take one strand, and cross it over the next strand ahead. Take the second strand, cross it over the end of the first-moved strand and across the standing part of the next strand ahead. Take the third strand, and cross it over the end of the strand last moved, then tuck the end through the bight of the next strand ahead (which, in the Three-Strand Knot, is the first strand that was moved). Draw the knot up, and it will appear as in the last two diagrams.

— The Ashley Book of Knots

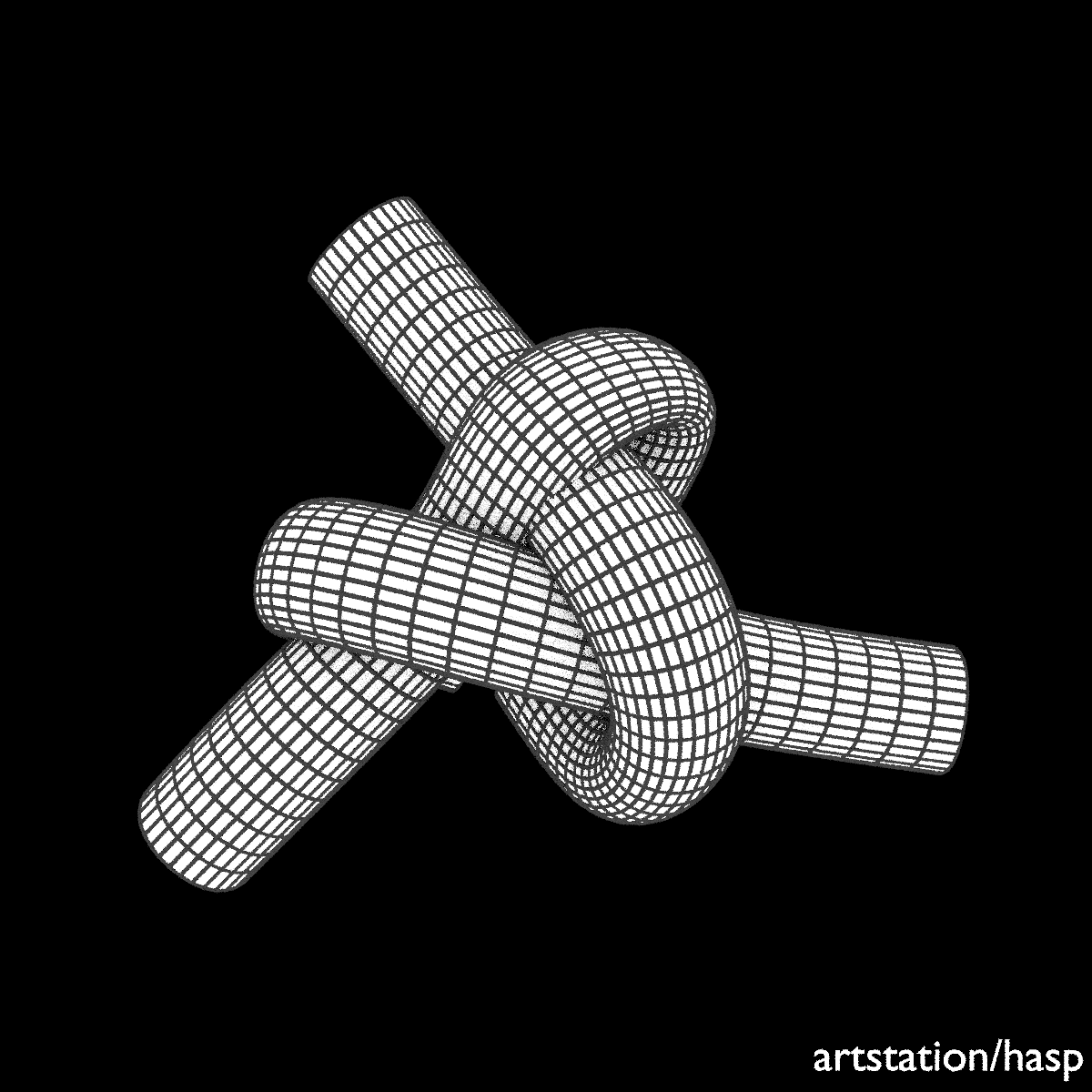
Crown (top view)

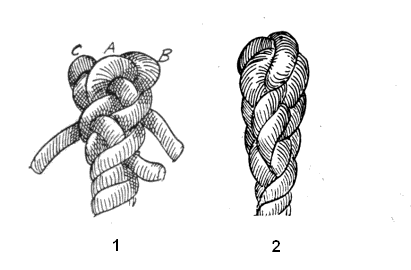
Crown tucked

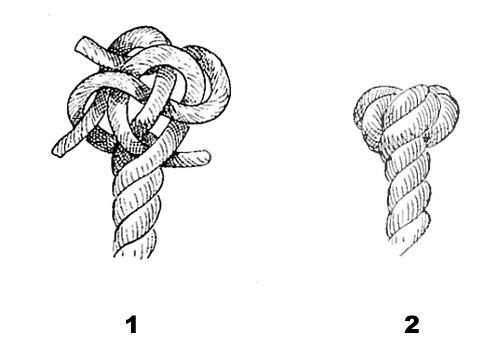
Double crown

== Wall knot ==
Wall knot
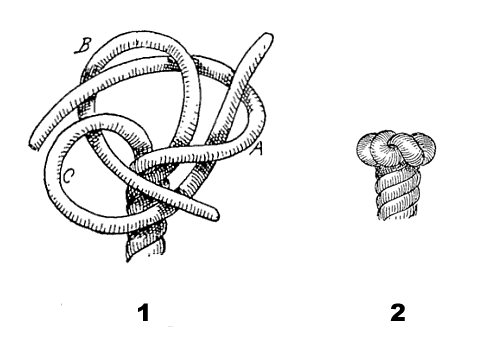
- Category: Decorative
- ABoK: 671

A wall knot is essentially a crown knot, but reversed.

671. The wall knot is the exact reverse of the crown knot. If either of these knots is turned upside down it becomes the other knot. But as the stem of a knot leads from the bottom, the knots ordinarily are different.

John Smith mentions the "wall knot" in 1627, Manwayring the "wale knot" in 1644, Blanckley the "whale knott" in 1750, and Falconer the "Walnut" in 1769. Even in Falconer's day standardized spelling and pronunciation had hardly been thought of...To tie a three-strand wall knot: Take one strand and bring it counterclockwise under the next strand. Take the next strand, and pass it under the end of the first-moved strand and under the standing part of the next. Take the third strand under the second end and up through the bight of the first-moved strand.

— The Ashley Book of Knots

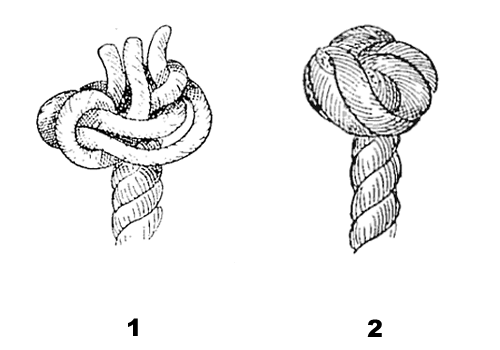
Double wall

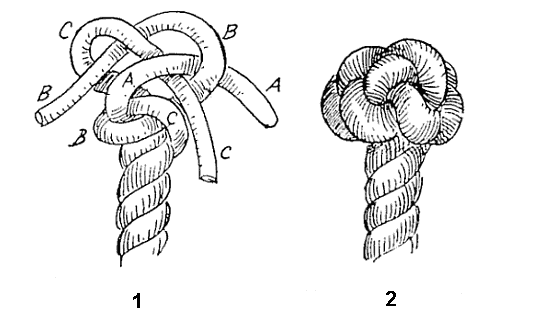
Wall crowned
(unfinished "wall and crown knot")

== See also ==
- List of knots
- Eye splice
- Underwriter's knot — two-strand wall knot

== Knob knots ==
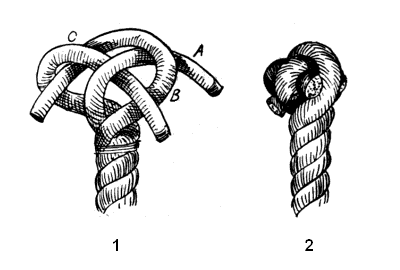
Crown knot

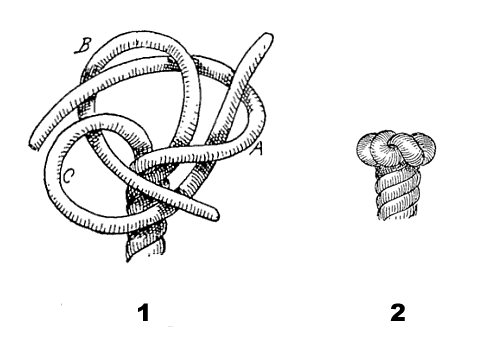
Wall knot

Wall and crown knot

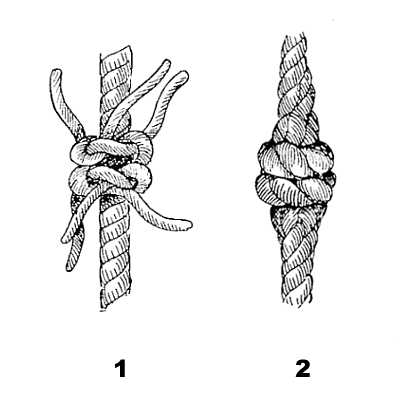
Shroud knot

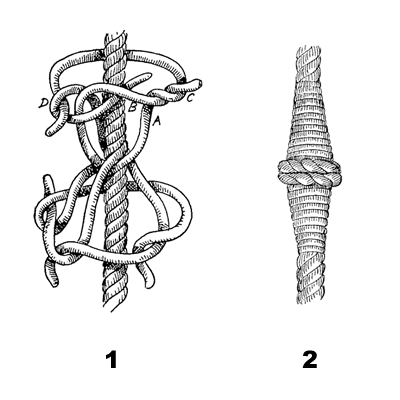
French shroud

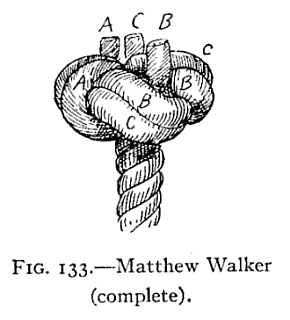
Matthew Walker knot

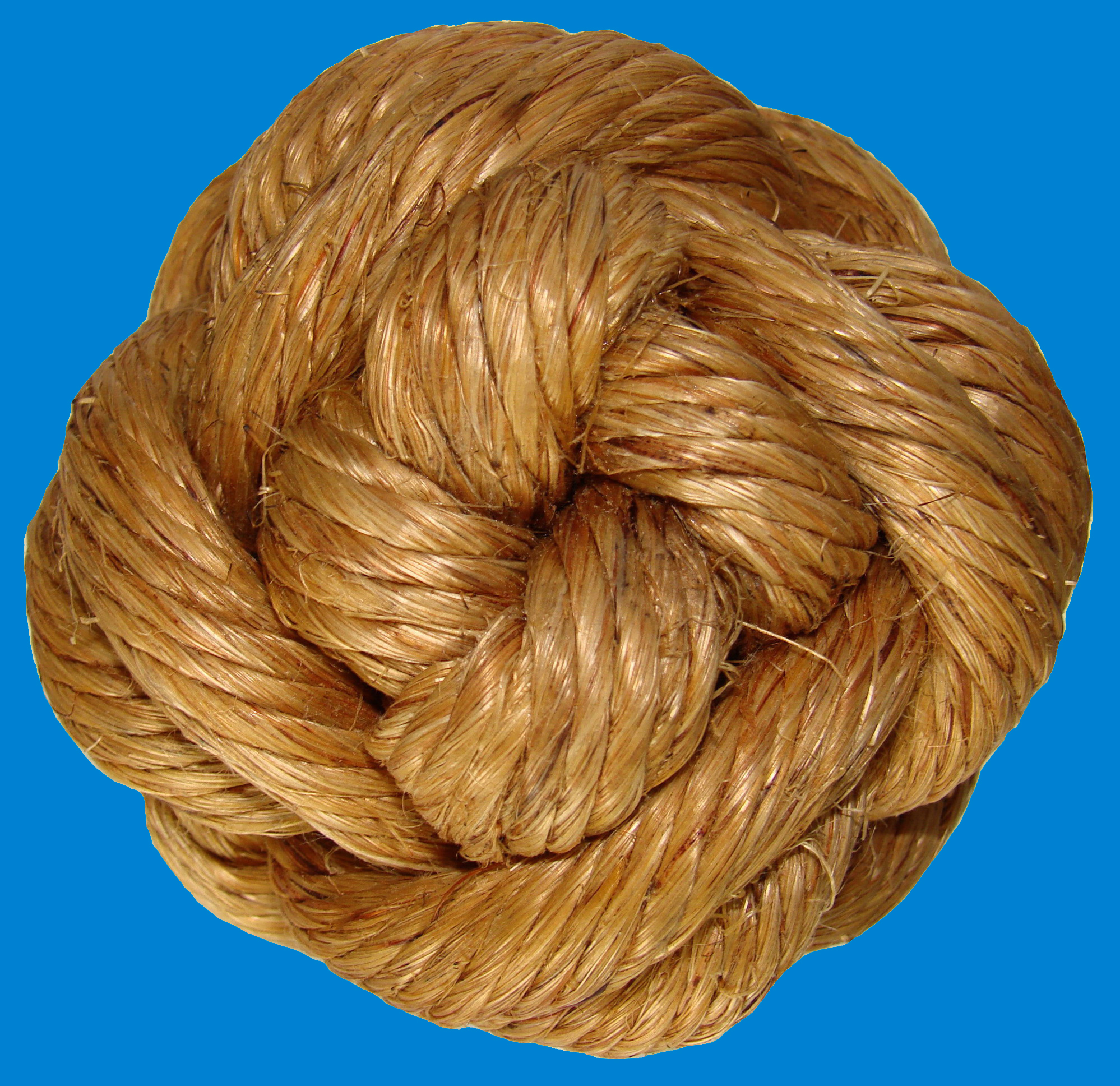
Rose knot

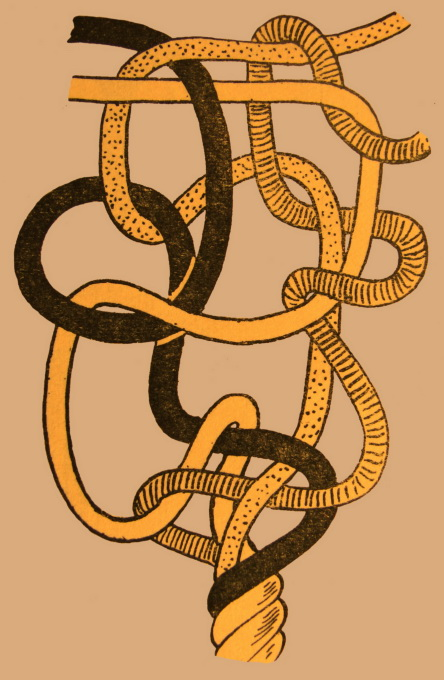
Tying of Rose knot
