= Looped square =

Symbol

The ⌘ symbol as seen on a Swedish road sign (No. H22) for national heritage

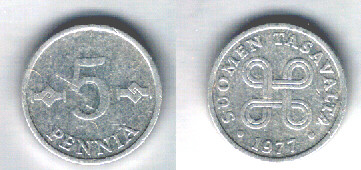
The ⌘ symbol on a 1977 Finnish 5 penni coin

The looped square (⌘), also known as Saint John's Arms, Saint Hannes cross (related to Swedish sankthanskors, Danish johanneskors, and Finnish hannunvaakuna or käpälikkö), and as the command-key symbol due to its use on the command key on Apple computer keyboards, is a symbol consisting of a square with outward pointing loops at its corners. It is referred to as a looped square, for example, in works regarding the Mississippian culture (approximately 800 AD to 1600 AD). It is also known as the place of interest sign when used on information signs, a practice that started in Finland in the 1950s, spreading to the other Nordic countries in the 1960s.

It is an ancient symbol used by several cultures, and remains in common use today. It belongs to a class of symbols which are called valknute in Norway.

== Ancient use ==
The symbol appears on a number of ancient objects in Northern Europe. It features prominently on a picture stone from Hablingbo, Gotland, Sweden, that was created between 400 and 600 AD.

It is also similar to a traditional heraldic emblem called a Bowen knot.

In Finland, the symbol was painted or carved on houses and barns, and domestic utensils such as tableware, to protect them and their owners from evil spirits and bad luck. The oldest surviving example is a pair of 1000-year-old (Finnish pre-Christian period) wooden skis decorated with the symbol.

The looped square also appears on artifacts of the Mississippian culture of the southeastern United States.

While not a true knot, many depictions follow the convention for heraldic knots in that the crossings of the strand obey an under–over pattern.

== Traditional names ==
The English names Saint John's Arms, Saint Hannes cross or Saint Hans's Cross as well as the Scandinavian names refer to John the Baptist. The connection is that the celebration of Midsummer's Eve is a major festival in Scandinavia, which in the Julian calendar coincided with the Christian feast celebrating the nativity of Saint John the Baptist, and that the (pagan) symbol was associated with the Midsummer celebrations.

== Modern use ==
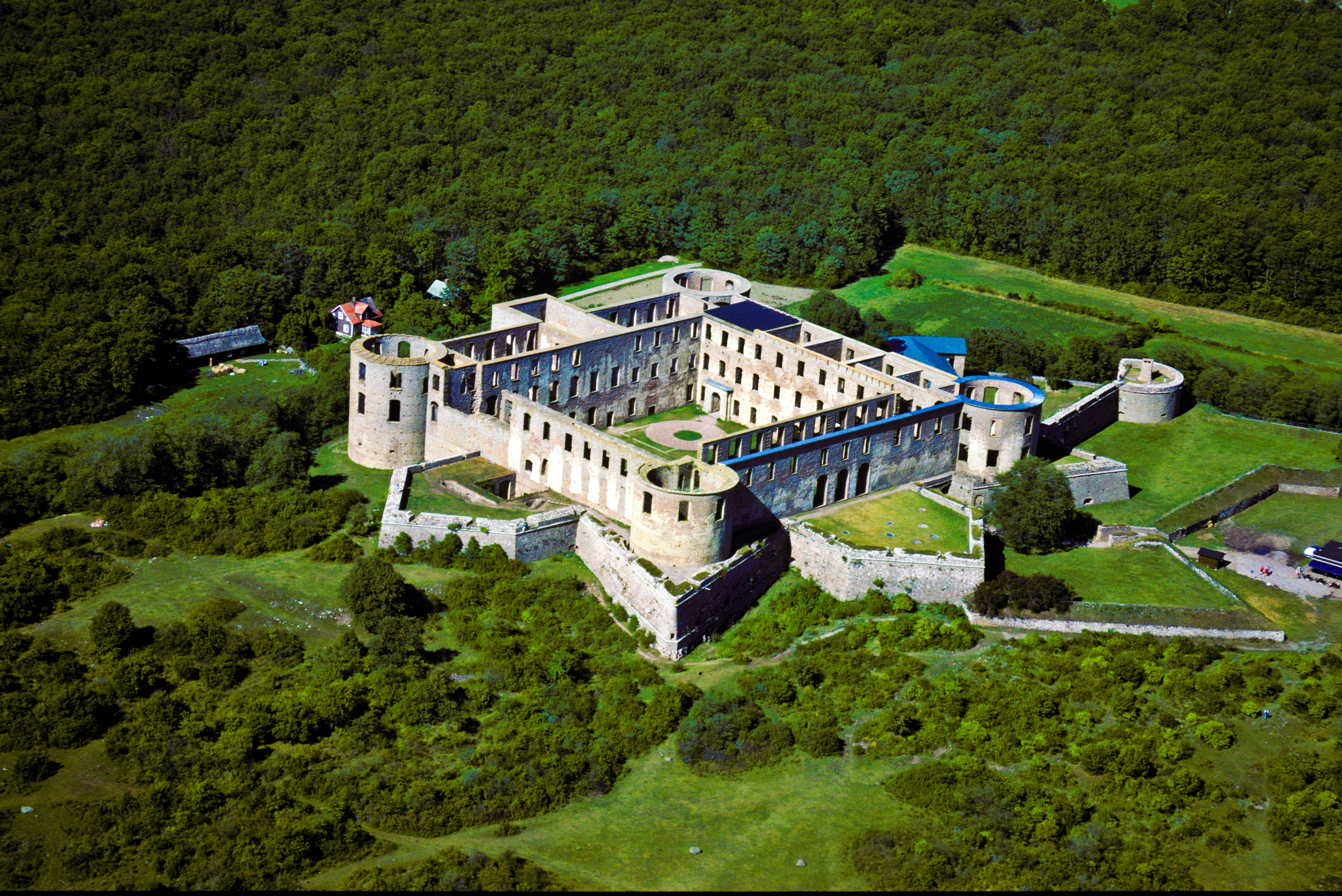
Aerial view of Borgholm Castle

In modern times, the symbol is commonly found in Belarus, Denmark, Estonia, Finland, Germany, Iceland, Latvia, Lithuania, Norway, Sweden, and Ukraine as an indicator of locations of cultural interest, beginning in Finland in the 1950s and spreading to the other Nordic countries in the 1960s. There has been modern speculation that it was chosen for its resemblance to an aerial view of Borgholm Castle; however, as stated its use for attractions began in Finland, not Sweden, and the symbol is well-represented in Scandinavian artifacts that predate the current castle by centuries.

The symbol later gained international recognition via computing. It is used on Apple keyboards as the symbol for the command key as well as in elementary OS as the symbol for the Super key.

The looped square is used in the logos of Belgian telecommunications company Proximus and Canadian software company DistillerSR.

== Encoding ==
In Unicode, it is encoded at U+2318 ⌘ PLACE OF INTEREST SIGN, in the block Miscellaneous Technical.

== Gallery ==
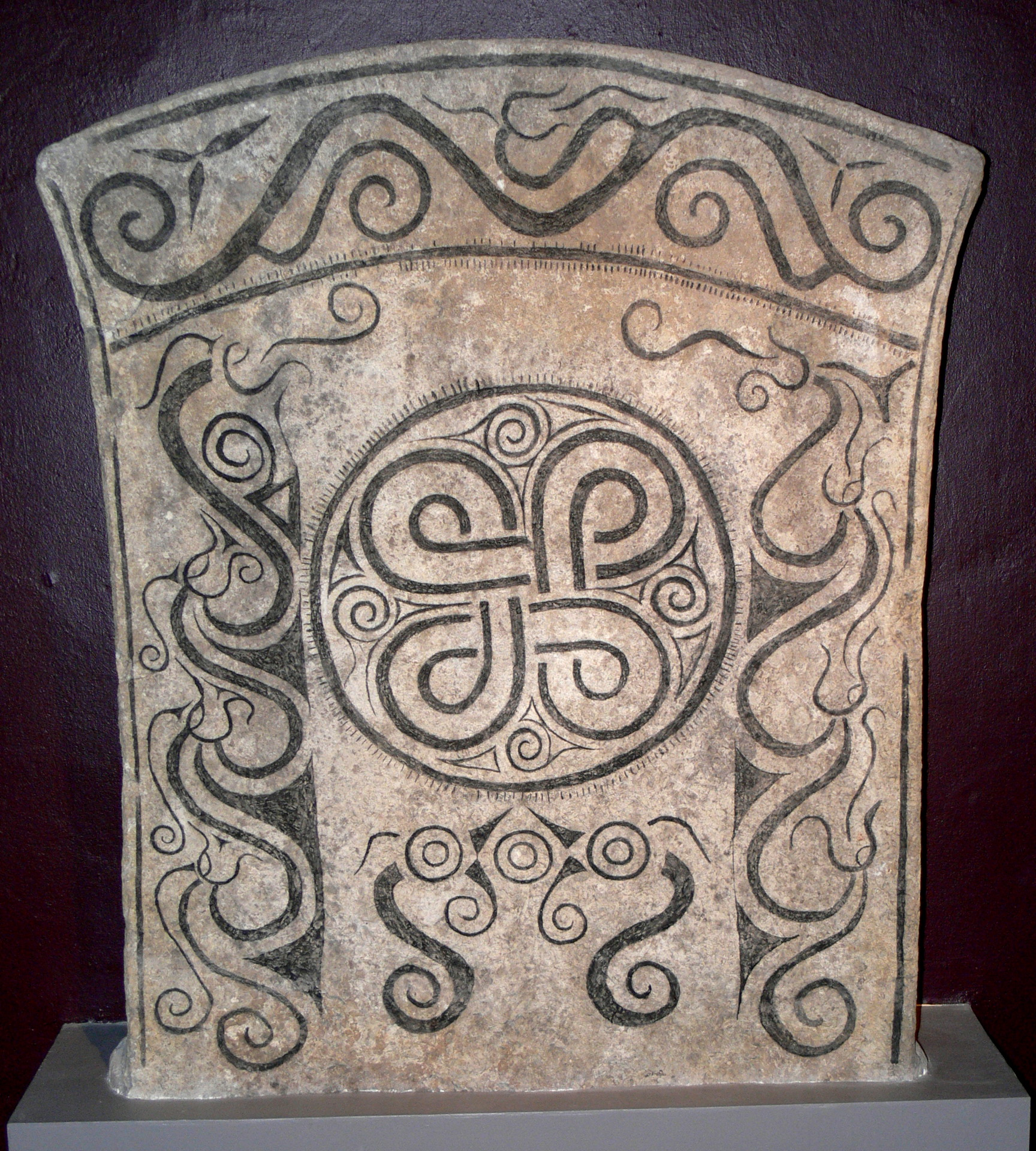
Migration Period picture stone from Havor, Hablingbo, Gotland; Gotland Museum, Visby

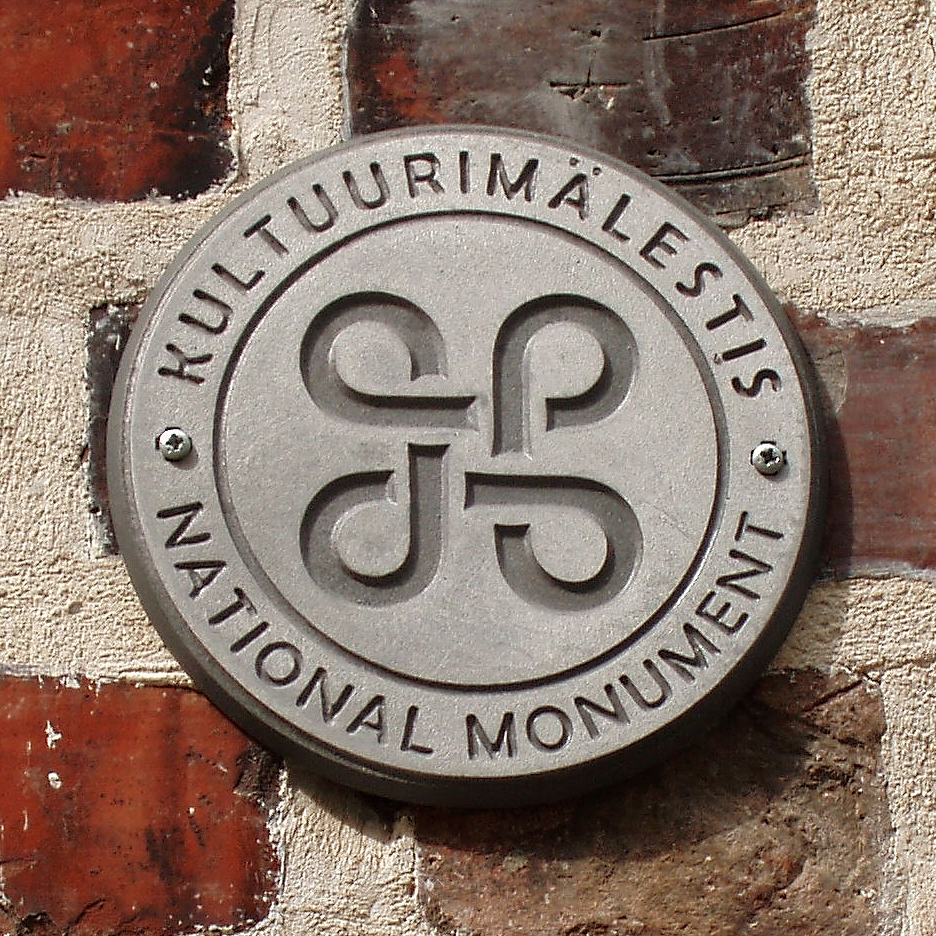
Designation for Estonian Cultural heritage monuments

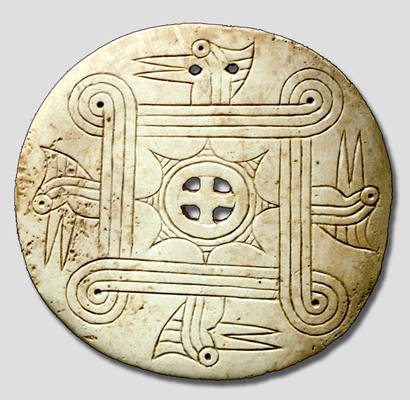
Cox mound gorget (Mississippian culture, found in Tennessee, c.1250–1450)

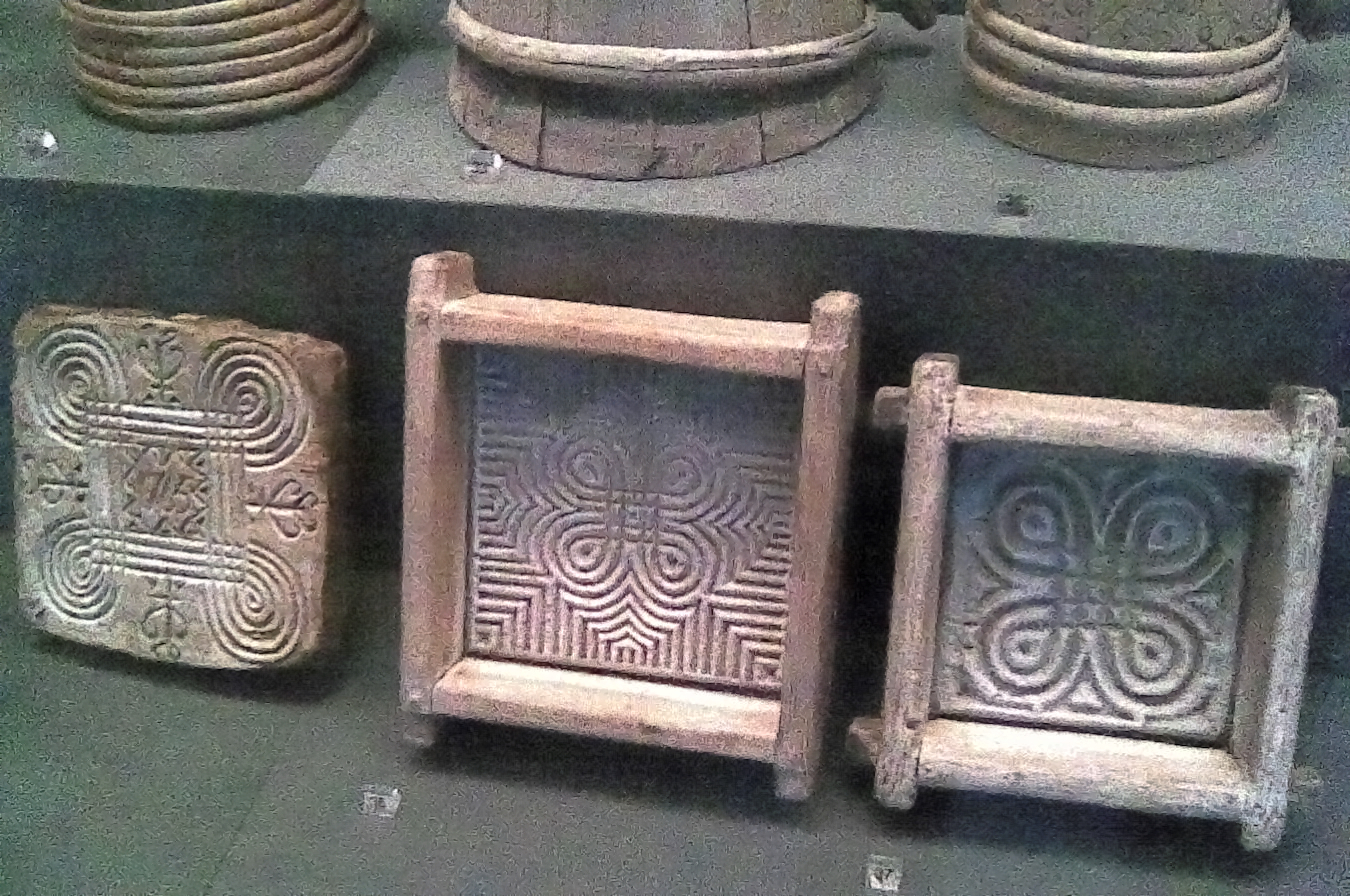
Cheese moulds in the National Museum of Finland, Helsinki

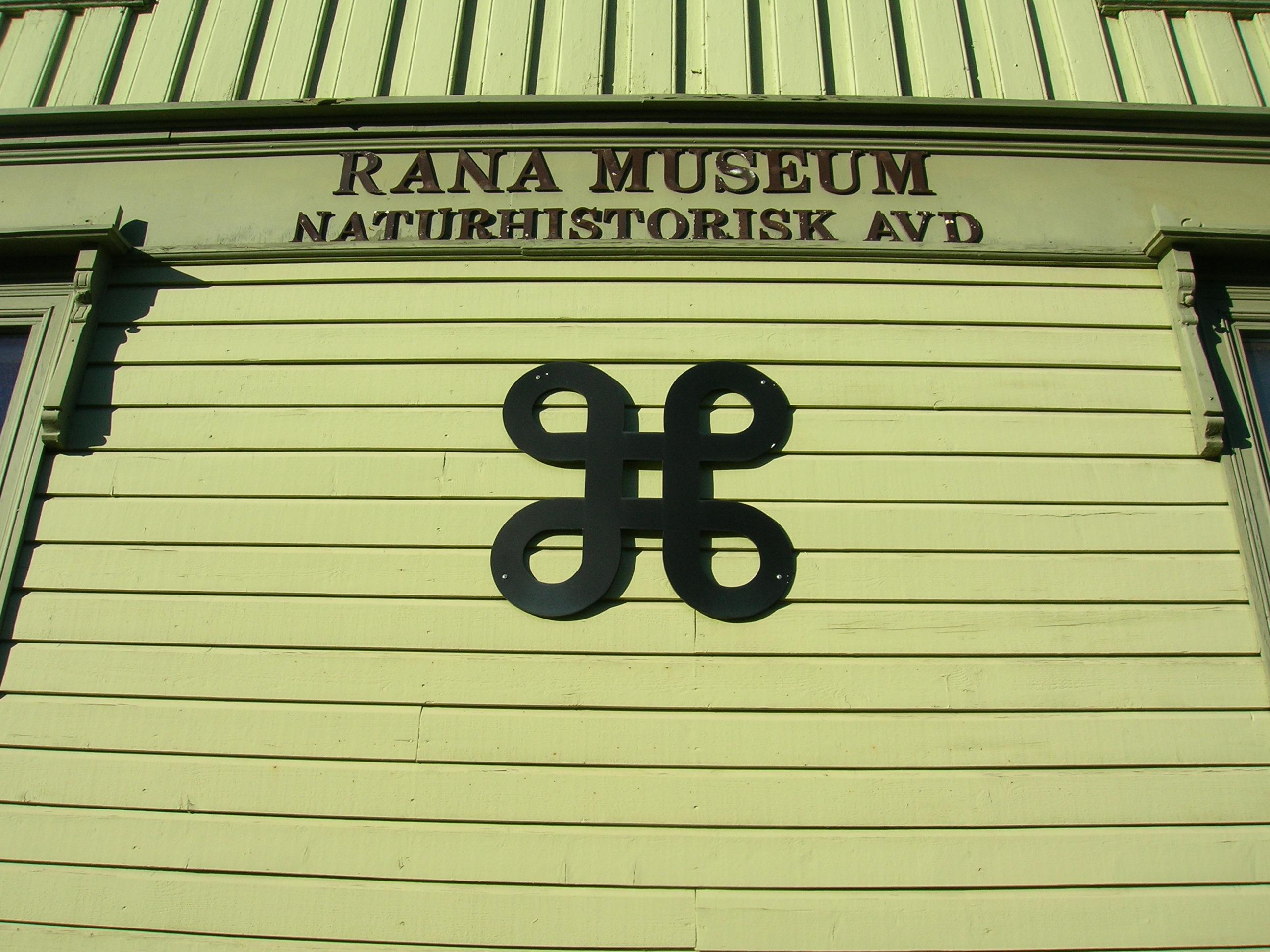
The ⌘ symbol, Rana museum, Norway

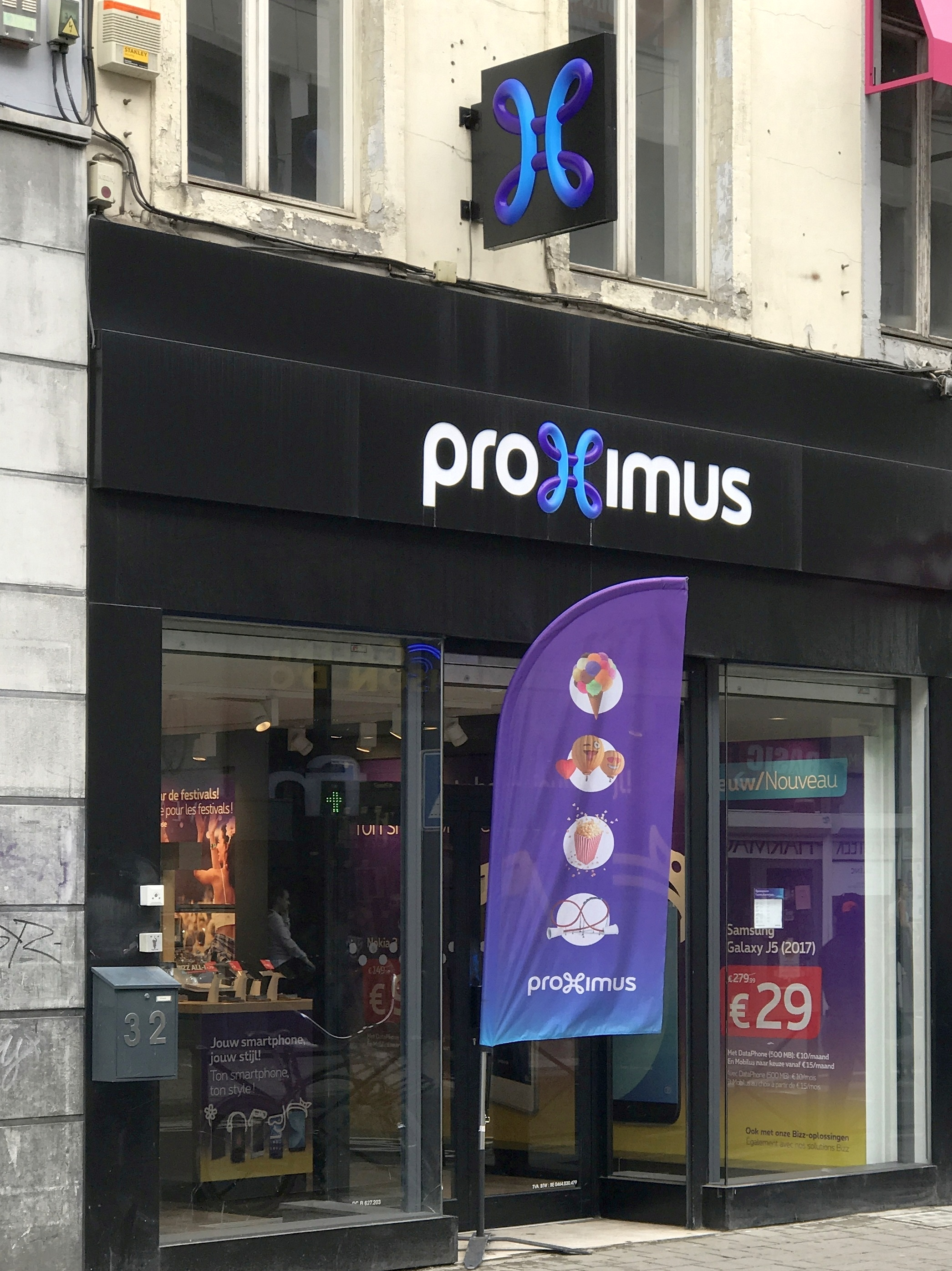
Proximus shop in Brussels (Belgium), showing a logo displaying the letter “x” by a looped-square-like shape

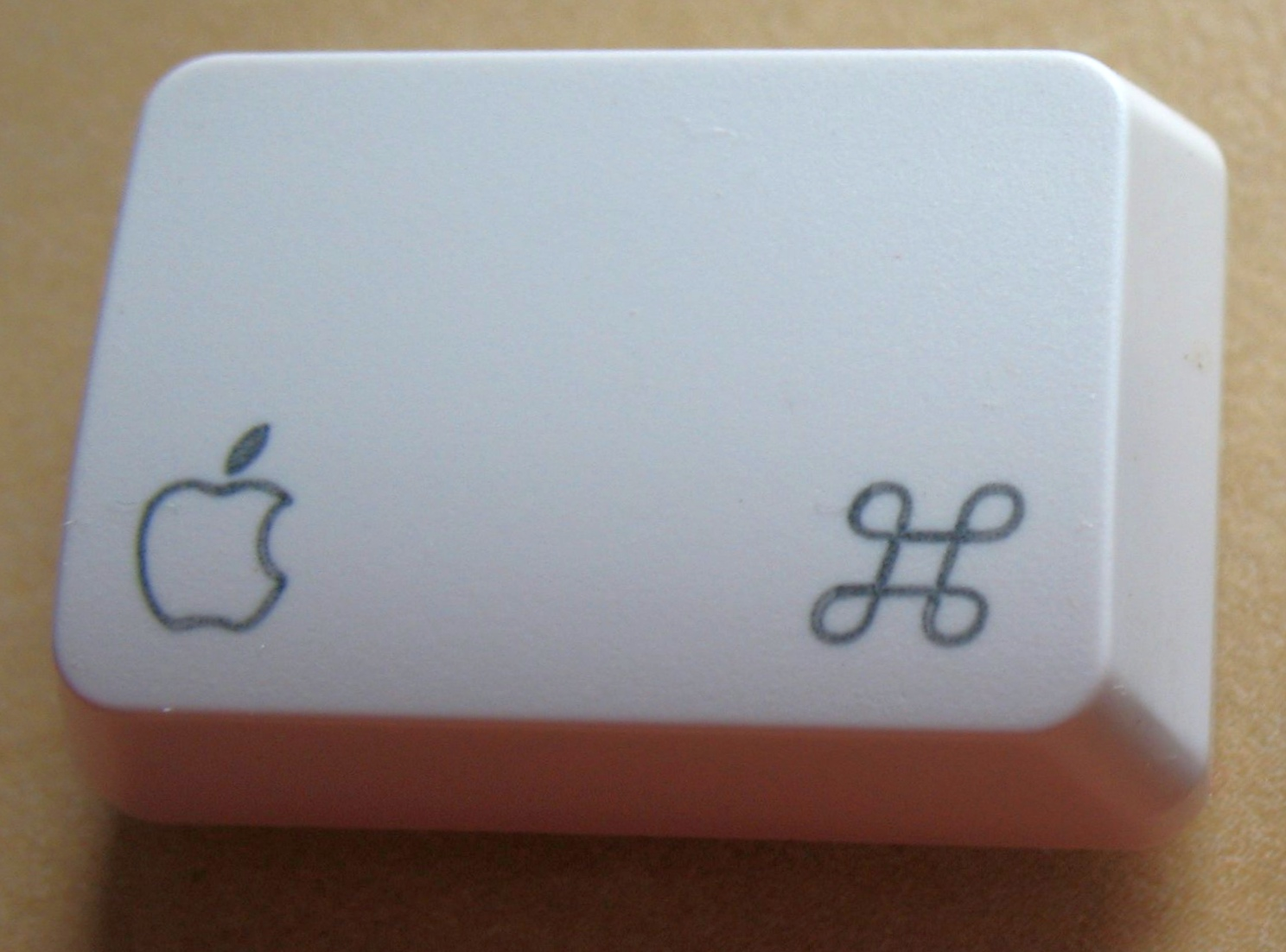
An Apple command key

== See also ==
- Bowen knot
- Camunian rose
- Valknut
