= Free Foresters Cricket Club =

English amateur cricket club

- Founded: 1856

Free Foresters Cricket Club is an English amateur cricket club, established in 1856 for players from the Midland counties of England. It is a 'wandering' (or nomadic) club, having no home ground.

The Free Foresters were founded by the Rev. William Kirkpatrick Riland Bedford, who had been appointed rector of Sutton Coldfield in 1850. At Oxford University, he had discovered cricket and in 1847 he had set up the Sutton Coldfield Cricket Club. The name of the Free Foresters was chosen to reflect that archery had been popular at the Rectory Park long before cricket was introduced. The club played its first match on 20 July 1856 against the Pilgrims of the Dee, at the Rectory Ground in Sutton Coldfield. In 1863, the Free Foresters presented the rector with a silver salver as a token of their esteem. It can be seen at Lord's cricket ground.

For many years, starting in 1912, their matches against Oxford University and Cambridge University had first-class status, the last such game being that against Oxford at The Parks in June 1968. The Foresters' side in that match, which they won by 299 runs, was captained by Donald Carr and included Mike Brearley, Mike Groves, Richard Hutton and Gamini Goonesena.

The team colours are crimson, green and white, adopted in 1858. The badge consists of two capital Fs wrapped in a Hastings knot, with the motto 'United though Untied', signifying that players are free to play for other clubs, and even play against Free Foresters.

In 2008, the club established Free Foresters Academy to offer young cricketers matches at a representative level. The founding Hon. Patron was Christopher Martin-Jenkins MBE. Since 2010, the FF Academy has played in Minor Counties U25 competitions (against Oxfordshire, Hertfordshire, Buckinghamshire, Bedfordshire and Lincolnshire) in a mixture of two-day, Twenty20 (Beynon Cup) and three-day formats, winning the three-day Tom Orford Trophy on a number of occasions. The academy was captained by David Smith until 2015 when he handed over to Paddy Sadler. In 2018, the academy was led by Edward Hyde.
