= Stora Hammars stones =

Four Viking Age image stones located in Gotland, Sweden

Coordinates: 57°51′10.7″N 19°01′43.2″E

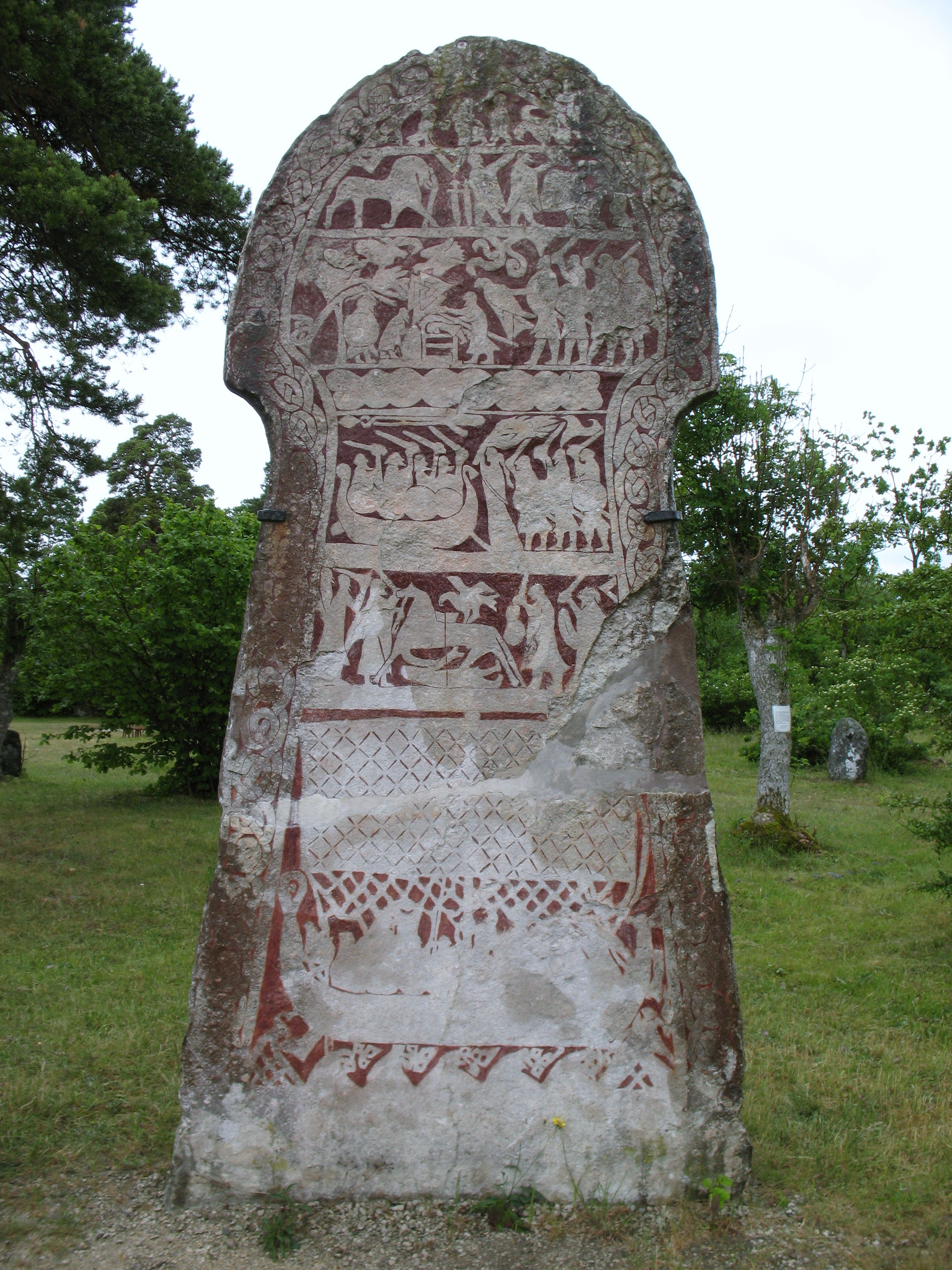
The Stora Hammars I image stone.

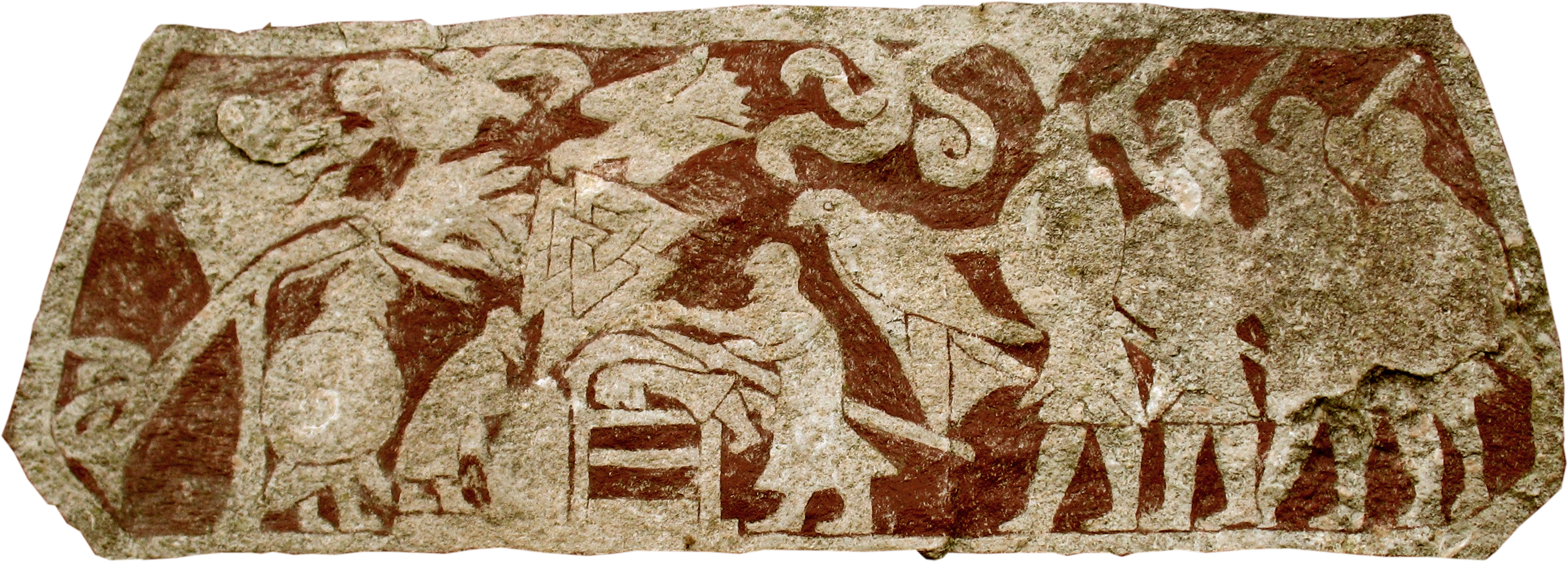
Detail from Stora Hammars I shows a man lying on his belly with another man using a weapon on his back, a Valknut, and two birds, one of which is held by a man to the right.

The Stora Hammars image stones are four Viking Age image stones, dating from around the 8th century CE, (therefore belonging to the Germanic Iron Age). Originally located in the Stora Hammars farm, near Lärbro parish, in Gotland, Sweden, they were transferred to the open-air museum Bungemuseet in Fårösund, in the same island, two of them in 1923 and the remaining two in 1946.

== Description ==
The four Stora Hammars image stones are phallic shaped. Similar combinations of death with this erotic symbolism occur on other Gotland rune and image stones. The images on the Stora Hammars II and IV stones are very worn and not currently decipherable.

=== Stora Hammars I ===
Depicted on the Stora Hammars I stone are six panels with mythological, religious and martial themes, including panels depicting a woman between two men, a sacrifice scene with a Valknut over an altar, a woman standing between a longship manned with armed warriors and another group of armed men, and a battle scene. It is interpreted as illustrating the legend of Hildr and its never-ending battle. The stone includes an image of a warrior about to be hanged in a tree, possibly as a blood eagle sacrifice, with a nearby Valknut (considered to be Odin's cult symbol) apparently giving validity to reports about this type human sacrifice in Norse paganism. Near the altar is a shaped stone, suggested by one scholar as being a cult stone similar to the Elgesem runestone.

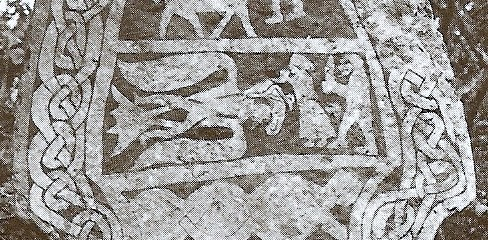
Detail from Stora Hammars III showing Odin in his eagle fetch (note the eagle's beard), Gunnlöð holding the mead of poetry, and Suttungr.

=== Stora Hammars III ===
The Stora Hammars III image stone has four panels, the lower of which shows a ship with warriors. One of the panels has been interpreted as depicting Odin in the form of an eagle taking the mead of poetry, a legend described in section 6 of the Skáldskaparmál. Gunnlöð and Suttungr are shown to the right of the eagle. Another panel depicts a rider on a horse being greeted by a woman who has been interpreted as being a Valkyrie. The woman appears to be wearing a long serk or underdress, which may be pleated, and a short overdress.

== See also ==
- Blood eagle
- Death in Norse paganism
- Tängelgarda stone
