= Hinckaert knot =

Dutch heraldic knot

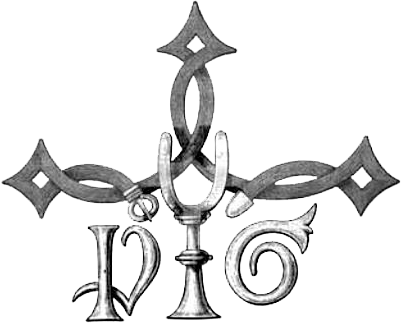
- The Hinckaert badge.

Information
- Family: Hinckaert family
- Region: Netherlands
- Note(s): Named for Philip Hinckaert, maître d'hôtel to Philip the Handsome in the late 15th century.

The Hinckaert knot, a type of decorative unknot, is a heraldic knot used primarily in Dutch heraldry. It is most notable for its appearance on the Hinckaert family heraldic badge, where a semi-angular form is used as canting arms, a common practice with heraldic badges.

The name "Hinckaert" is delineated as a derivation of hincken, "to limp", in the badge. Hence the center crutch, and the buckle on the knot, implying that it is a strap used to attach the crutch to the leg. The dexter "P" and sinister "G" are traditionally translated as standing for Philip (Hinckaert), with whom the knot originated, and his wife, née Gasparine.

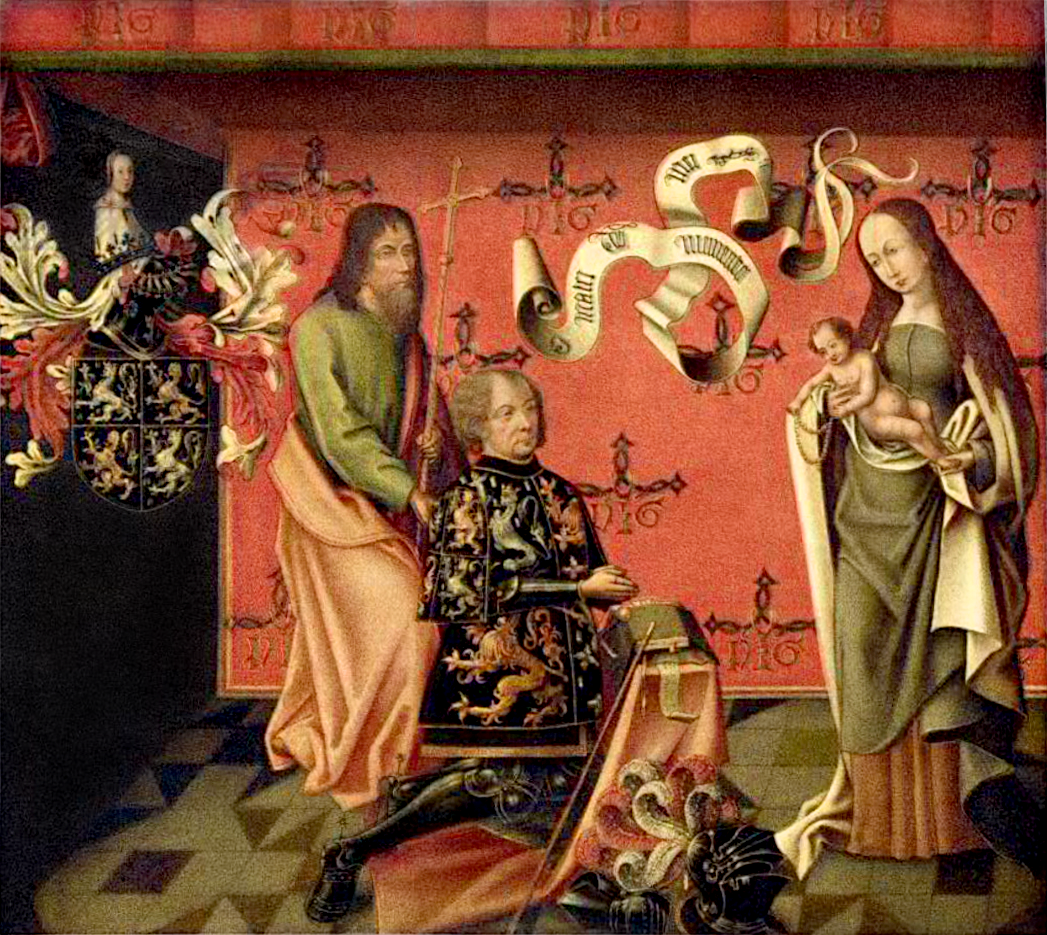
A portrait of Philip Hinckaert (kneeling). In the background the wall is diapered in the Hinckaert knot.
