= Paddy Sadler =

English cricketer

Personal information
- Full name: Patrick Thomas Sadler
- Born: 28 September 1991 (age 35); Waltham Forest, London, England
- Batting: Right-handed
- Bowling: Right-arm fast-medium
- Role: Bowler

Domestic team information
- Years: Team
- 2011–2014: Cambridge University

Career statistics
Competition	First-class
Matches	9
Runs scored	93
Batting average	9.30
100s/50s	0/0
Top score	34
Balls bowled	1,590
Wickets	11
Bowling average	80.45
5 wickets in innings	0
10 wickets in match	0
Best bowling	3/50
Catches/stumpings	4/–
- Source: ESPNcricinfo, 10 April 2020

Patrick Thomas Sadler (born 28 September 1991). is an English cricketer who has played for Cambridge University Cricket Club, captaining the side for the 2013 season, Cambridge MCCU and Scotland Under-19, which he captained in the 2012 Under-19 Cricket World Cup: he also played for the Scotland Development XI. He was born in Leytonstone and attended the Royal High School, Edinburgh and Churchill College, Cambridge. On going down from Cambridge in 2014, he became a teacher and Master in Charge of Cricket at Tonbridge School until 2018. Whilst at Tonbridge, Paddy has played for Tunbridge Wells Cricket Club in the Premier Division of the Kent Cricket League and has Captained the Free Foresters Academy in their Minor Counties Under-25s matches during 2016 and 2017.

Paddy made his debut in First-class cricket in 2011 for the Cambridge MCCU against Surrey, and played nine First-class games for Cambridge MCCU and Cambridge University between 2011 and 2014. He played in six One-Day International matches for Scotland Under-19s.
