= Underwriter's knot =

Knot used in electrical wiring

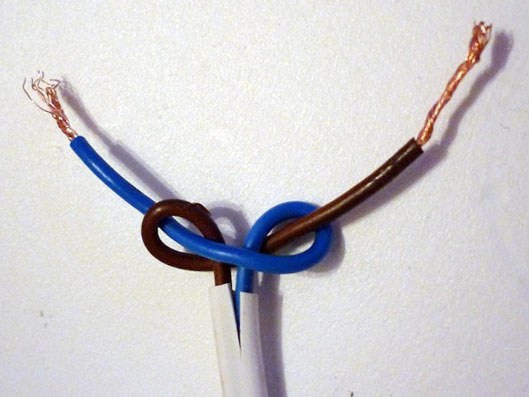
- Names: Underwriter's knot, Two-strand wall knot
- Category: Stopper
- Related: wall knot, crown knot
- Typical use: electrical
- Caveat: Note that the colors in this depiction do not match current practises in either the UK or the US, nor is this cable in keeping with current safety standards for electrical installations
- ABoK: #237, #775

The underwriter's knot is used in electrical wiring as strain relief to prevent a cable from being pulled from electrical terminals when the cable is pulled.

== History ==
Clifford Ashley listed it as an electrician's knot in 1944. He suggested it be used "where rough treatment is expected" and described it as a two-strand wall knot.

The name may come from its use by fire underwriters, who understood its importance in the prevention of both electrocution and fire.

== Function ==
The knot is typically used as a stopper knot where a lamp or appliance cord passes through a hole or slot of a plug or socket. Its purpose is to "reduce strain on the screw terminal connections—where the metal parts of the wires connect to the socket or plug—and prevent the wires from pulling free."

== See also ==
- List of knots
