= Tängelgårda stones =

Nordic picture stones in Gotland, Sweden

Coordinates: 57°49′N 18°43′E

Tängelgårda I

The Lärbro Tängelgårda stones are a group of four Gotland stones in the Swedish History Museum Stockholm, of which three, numbers I, III, and IV are image stones. The best known of these, Tängelgårda I, includes scenes that have been interpreted in terms of the cult of Odin. The stones were found together at a site in Lärbro parish, and are believed to have been re-used to enclose a grave.

== Provenance ==
The four stones were discovered in the 1860s at Fånggården, near the farm of Tängelgårda, in Lärbro parish on Gotland, and removed to the Swedish History Museum. The site, presumed to have been a stone setting in which the four stones had been reused, was not investigated and the exact location has been lost.

== Tängelgårda I ==
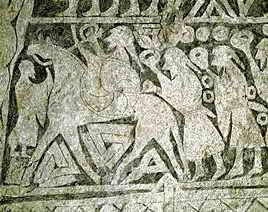
Detail from Tängelgårda I: rider and followers bearing rings

The largest and best known of the group, Tängelgårda I is a five-panel tall stone variously dated to 400–550 CE, the 8th century, or the Viking Age, between 800 and 1100. The bottom panel shows a large ship. The upper four panels have been related to the cult of Odin; they include a battle scene with birds of prey (ravens) in the top panel, a horse in the third panel with additional legs or other structures under it (possibly Odin's eight-legged horse, Sleipnir), and two valknuts in the fourth panel. The procession of men with downward-pointed swords in the third panel appears funereal; there appears to be a body lying on the horse's back. In the fourth panel, the rider and the men following him raise rings in one hand that have been compared to oath rings and to rings bestowed by Germanic lords on their followers. This fourth panel has been interpreted as a hero and his followers being welcomed into Valhalla, and related specifically to the legend of Sigurd.

== Tängelgårda III ==
Tängelgårda III, a three-panel tall stone, is heavily damaged. It is dated to the Viking Age, between 800 and 1100. The third panel depicts a ship; the first and second show two horses that may have been carved using the same template as the three horses on Tängelgårda I.

== Tängelgärda IV ==
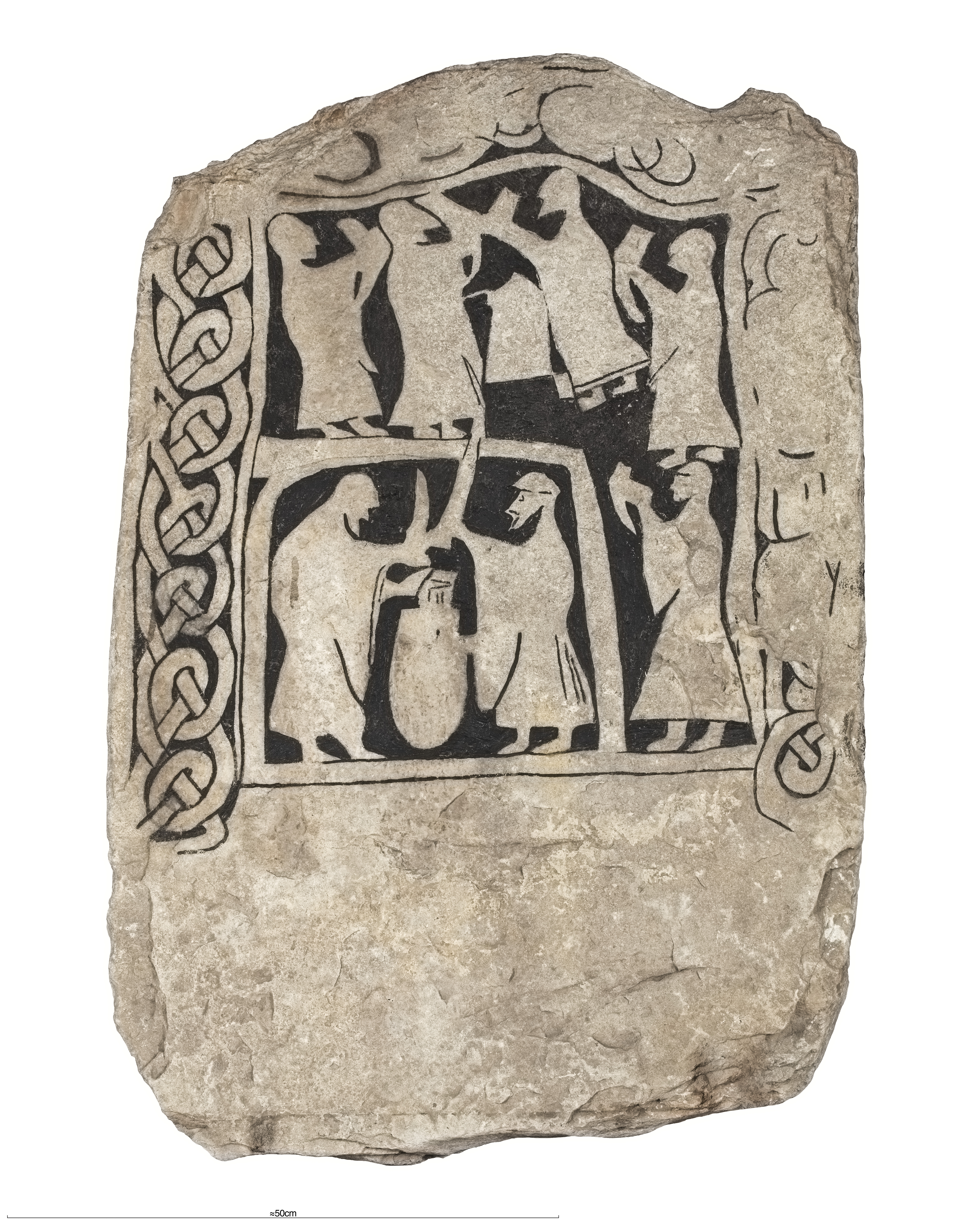
Tängelgårda IV

Tängelgårda IV is a two-panel dwarf stone with a suggested date range of the second half of the 8th century or more broadly the Viking Age or earlier, between 500 and 1100, or to the Viking Age or the early Middle Ages, between 800 and 1250. It depicts men drinking from horns and standing in a building. All but one of the figures may have been carved using the same template. Tängelgårda II, a "blind" (blank) stone, is of similar shape to Tängelgårda IV.

== See also ==
- Stora Hammars stones, another group of four stones from Lärbro
