= Harrington knot =

Decorative heraldic knot

The Harrington knot.

The Harrington knot is a decorative heraldic knot, the badge of the Harrington family. It is in essence identical to the fret.
