= Heneage knot =

Decorative heraldic knot

The Heneage Knot.

The Heneage knot is a decorative heraldic knot, the badge of the Heneage family of Lincolnshire, England. It was awarded to Sir Thomas Heneage by Queen Elizabeth I in 1594.
