= Lacy knot =

Heraldic knot

The Lacy knot

The Lacy or de Lacy knot is a decorative heraldic knot, the badge of the de Lacy family. It features in the crest of the borough of Burnley and heraldic badge of Kirklees.
