= Dacre knot =

Heraldic knot

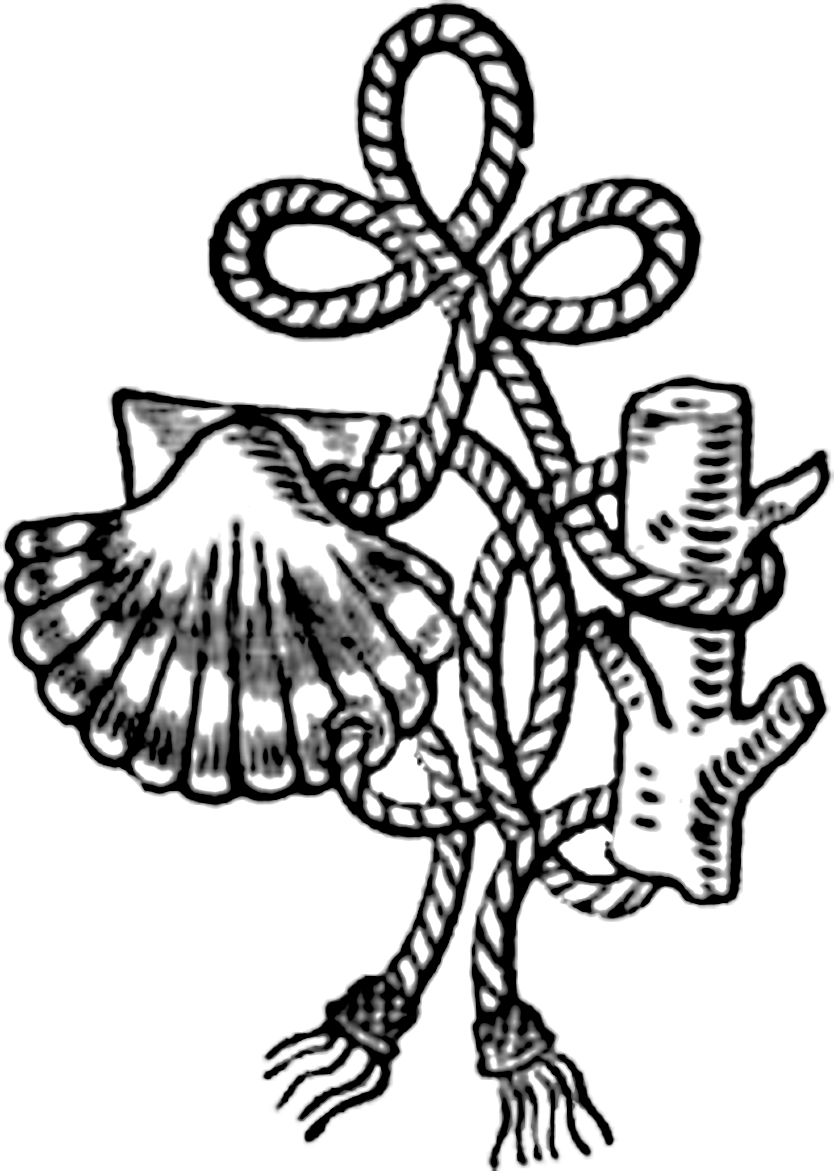
- The Dacre badge.

Information
- Family: Dacre family
- Region: Gilsland

The Dacre knot, a type of decorative unknot, is a heraldic knot used primarily in English heraldry. It is most notable for its appearance on the Dacre family heraldic badge, where its two lower dexter loops entwine a scallop, and its two lower sinister loops entwine a log.
