= Valknut =

Germanic multi-triangular symbol, occurs in several forms

Valknut variations. On the left unicursal trefoil forms; on the right tricursal linked triangle forms.

The valknut is a symbol consisting of three interlocked triangles forming subliminal triskelion at its center. The term valknut is a modern development; it is not known what term or terms were used to refer to the symbol historically.

Scholars have proposed a variety of explanations for the symbol, sometimes associating it with the god Odin, and it has been compared to the three-horned symbol found on the 9th-century Snoldelev Stone, to which it may be related.

== Archaeological record ==
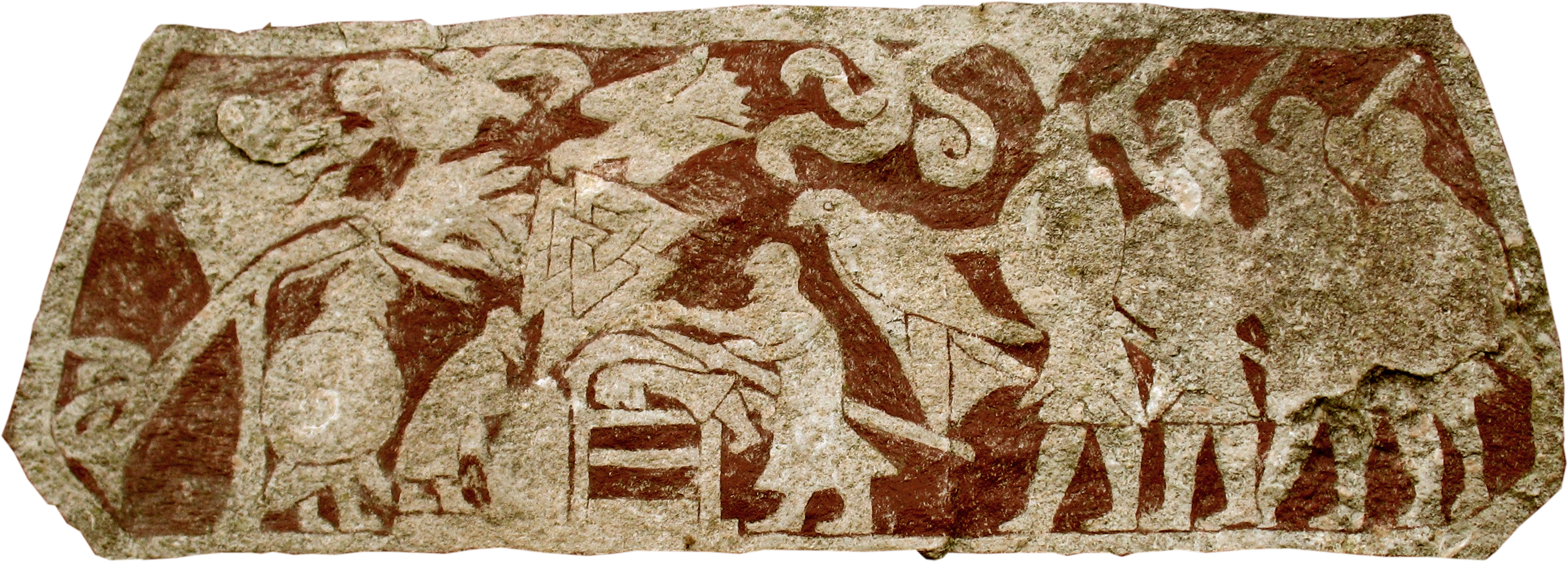
A section of the Stora Hammars I stone in Gotland, Sweden, depicts a valknut in a central and predominant position, appearing alongside figures interpreted as Odin with a characteristic spear shunting another figure into a burial mound while a raven is overhead and another man is hanged.

The valknut appears on a wide variety of objects found in areas inhabited by the Germanic peoples. The symbol is prominently featured on the Nene River Ring, an Anglo-Saxon gold finger ring dated to around the 8th to 9th centuries. In 2024, an English shilling showing both the symbol and a person holding a cross was found near Norwich. It has been interpreted as a mixing of religious imagery, with the cross being a Christian symbol and the valknut being heathen. This is consistent with its dating to the 7th century AD, when Christianity was being adopted in England.

A wooden bed in the Viking Age Oseberg Ship buried near Tønsberg, Norway, features a carving of the symbol on an ornately stylized bedpost and the Oseberg tapestry fragments, a partially preserved tapestry found within the ship burial, also features the symbol.

Additionally, the valknut appears prominently on two picture stones from Gotland, Sweden: the Stora Hammars I stone and the Tängelgårda stone.

The historically attested instances of the symbol appear in two traditional, topologically distinct forms. The symbol appears in unicursal form, topologically a trefoil knot also seen in the triquetra. This unicursal form is found, for example, on the Tängelgårda stone. The symbol also appears in tricursal form, consisting of three linked triangles, topologically equivalent to the Borromean rings. This tricursal form can be seen on one of the Stora Hammars stones, as well as upon the Nene River Ring, and on the Oseberg ship bed post. Although other forms are topologically possible, these are the only attested forms found so far.

In Norwegian Bokmål, the term valknute is used for a polygon with a loop on each of its corners. In the English language, the looped, four-cornered symbol is called Saint John's Arms.

== Theories and interpretations ==
Several explanations for the symbol have been proposed:

=== Hrungnir's heart ===
Chapter 17 of the 13th century Prose Edda book Skáldskaparmál contains the following description of the heart of the jötunn Hrungnir: "Hrungnir had a heart that was famous. It was made of hard stone with three sharp-pointed corners just like the carved symbol hrungnishjarta [Hrungnir's heart]." Comparisons have been made between this symbol description and the symbol known as the valknut.

=== Odin and mental binds ===
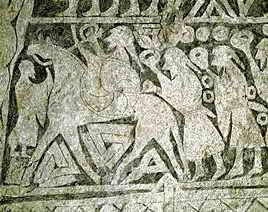
The Tängelgårda stone from Gotland, Sweden, features valknuts below a depiction of a horse.

Hilda Ellis Davidson theorizes a connection between the valknut, the god Odin, and "mental binds":

For instance, beside the figure of Odin on his horse shown on several memorial stones there is a kind of knot depicted, called the valknut, related to the triskele. This is thought to symbolize the power of the god to bind and unbind, mentioned in the poems and elsewhere. Odin had the power to lay bonds upon the mind, so that men became helpless in battle, and he could also loosen the tensions of fear and strain by his gifts of battle-madness, intoxication, and inspiration.

Davidson says that similar symbols are found beside figures of wolves and ravens on "certain cremation urns" from Anglo-Saxon cemeteries in East Anglia.

=== Other ===
Because the symbol appears on picture stones with Odin and on burial gifts in the Oseberg ship burial, Rudolf Simek says that the symbol may have been associated with religious practices surrounding death.

== Topology ==
The valknut is topologically equivalent to either the Borromean rings, the trefoil knot, or (in modern use only) a closed three-link chain, depending on the particular artistic depiction:

The valknut as Borromean rings
(Knot Atlas L6a4)

The valknut as trefoil knot or triquetra (unicursal)
(Knot Atlas 3_1)

The valknut as closed 3-link chain
(Knot Atlas L6n1)

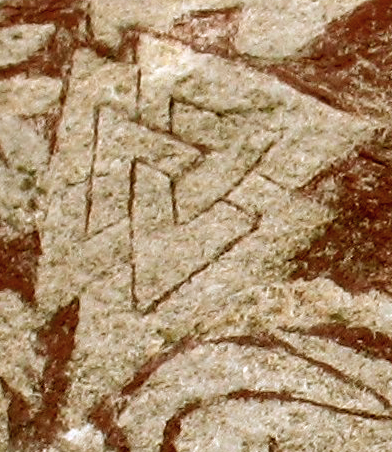
As Borromean rings on the Stora Hammars I stone

== Modern popular culture ==
The symbol is used for a variety of purposes in modern popular culture. The valknut symbol is used as a religious symbol by some adherents of Heathenry, a new religious movement inspired by historic Germanic paganism.

In Europe, the Swedish forest products company Svenska Cellulosa Aktiebolaget uses a triquetra valknut as their logo, which can be commonly seen on many products produced by the company; the DFB has used a logo inspired by the unicursal form of the valknut for the Germany national football team since 1991.

The symbol appears as the fretboard inlay on some of Arch Enemy/Carcass guitarist Michael Amott's signature Dean Guitars "Tyrant" models, and it is also used as a logo by American engineering firm RedViking. In Civilization VI, the valknut is the national symbol of Norway, which in the game is led by Harald Hardrada and mostly representative of Vikings rather than the modern country.

Bogd Bank of Mongolia uses the same symbol as their main corporate logo.

In modern Norway, the word "valknut" means "knot of those fallen in battle", connecting the symbol to the god Odin and representing the glory of death in battle.

The valknut has seen some use by White supremacists.

In the gacha game Girls Creation, the character Fiora, representing Munch's The Scream, has a Valknut as a hair decoration, as a reference to Munch's Norwegian roots.

== See also ==
- Mjölnir, a symbol representing the hammer of the god Thor, particularly popular during the Viking Age
- Looped square, a symbol that produces a square with outward pointing loops at its corners
- Triquetra, a symbol composed of three interlaced arcs
- Triskelion, a type of hooked cross representing three bent human limbs
