= Savoy knot =

Decorative knot

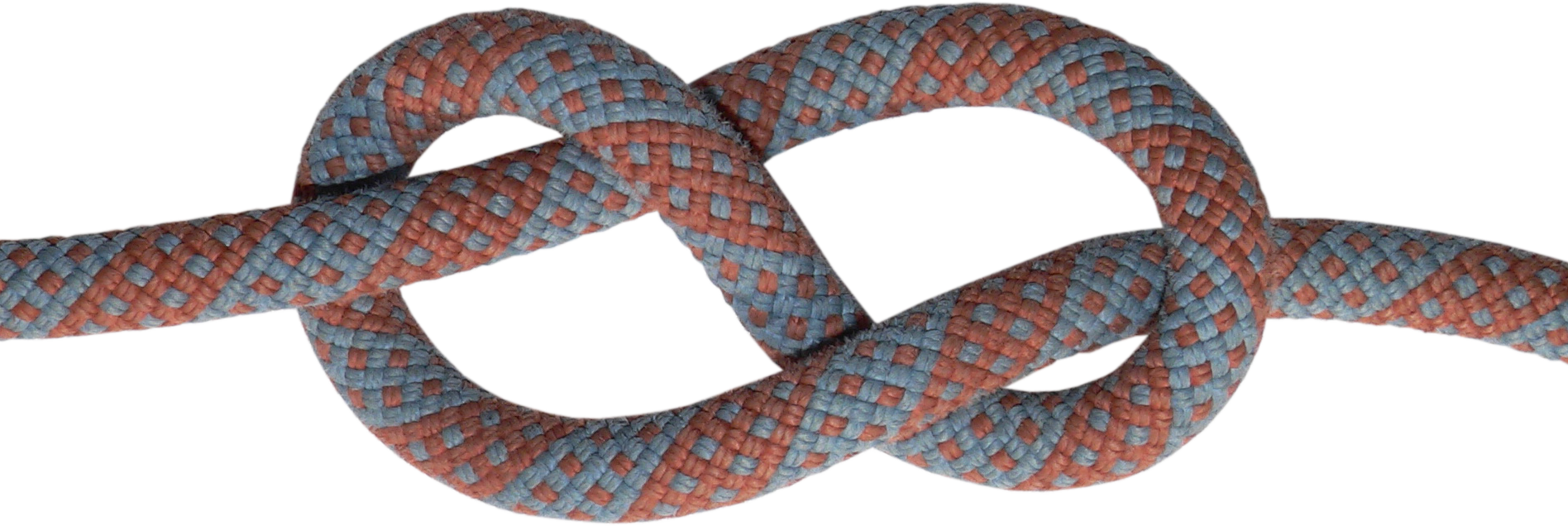

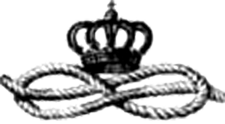
- The Savoy badge.

Information
- Family: House of Savoy
- Region: Savoy
- Notes: The first to bear the knot is said to have been Thomas I, Count of Savoy, in the 13th century.

The Savoy knot, a type of decorative knot, is a heraldic knot used primarily in Italian heraldry. It is most notable for its appearance on the heraldic badge of the House of Savoy, where it is accompanied by the motto Stringe ma non costringe, "It tightens, but does not constrain". The Cavendish knot is an identical heraldic knot. In shape, the Savoy knot is comparable to a figure eight.

When used outside heraldry (as a real knot), it is known as a figure-eight knot.

The Savoy knot can also be seen on the Alfa Romeo automobile badge (founded and manufactured in Milan, Italy) up to 1943.

== See also ==
- List of knots
- Order of the Most Holy Annunciation
