= Shroud knot =

- Category: Bend
- Typical use: joining two ends of rope
- Caveat: less secure than a full splice
- ABoK: 1565

The shroud knot is a multi-strand bend knot used to join two ends of laid (or twisted) rope together.

Shroud knots, in general, are a class of knots in which the individual strands of laid rope are knotted, but not woven, to the individual strands of another laid rope. This makes them more secure than a simple bend but less secure than a full splice; however, they use less rope than a full splice would. The most common form of shroud knot involves two interlocking wall knots.

The name "shroud knot" refers to the shrouds connected to a ship's mast. If a shroud was shot through, the shroud knot provided a way to quickly repair it using minimal rope. As modern ships now use steel cable for the most part, the knots are now more often used decoratively than functionally.

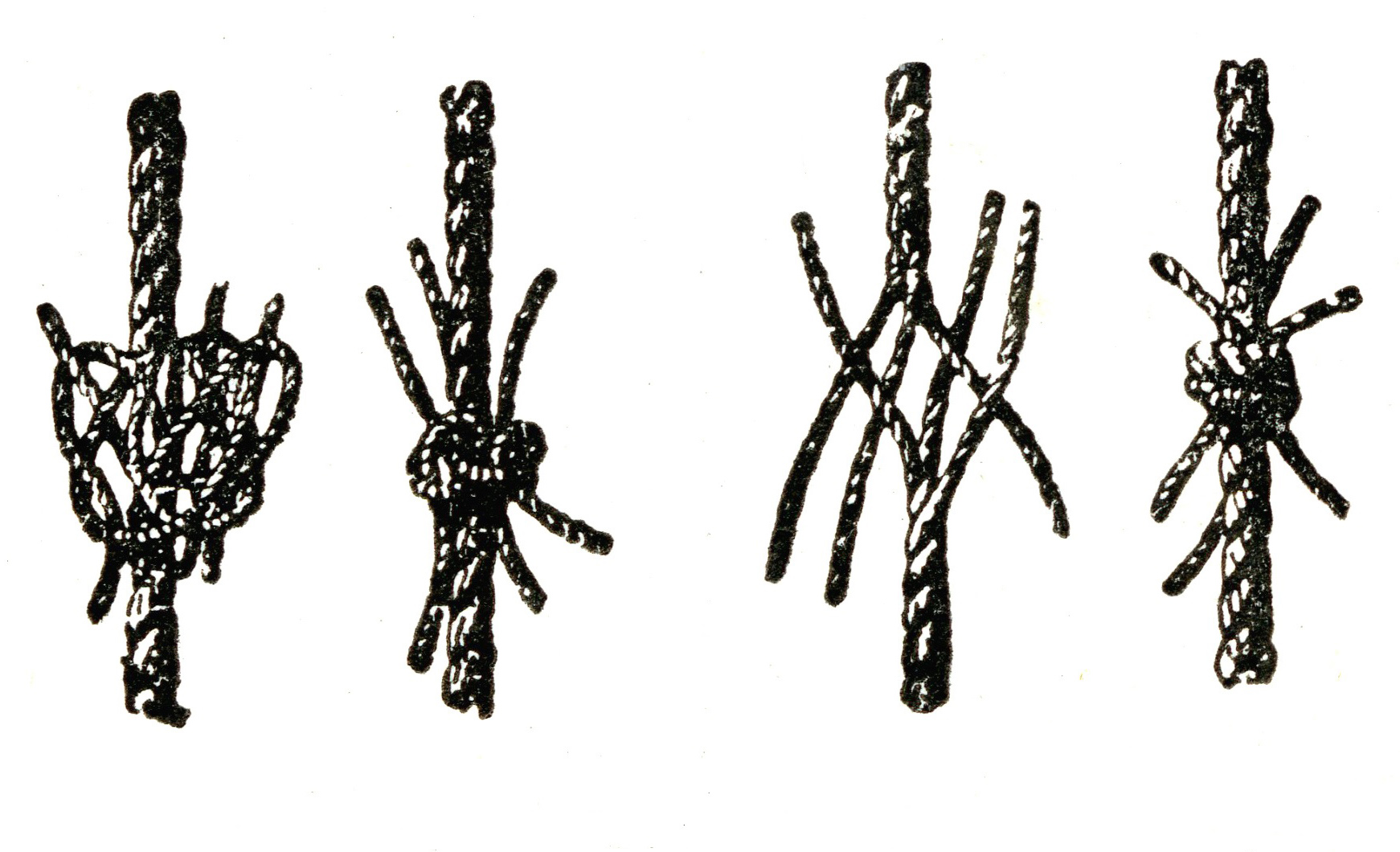
Several types of shroud knots (two simple and two double ones)

== See also ==
- List of bend knots
- List of knots
