= Picture stone =

Ornate slab of stone from ancient Northern Europe

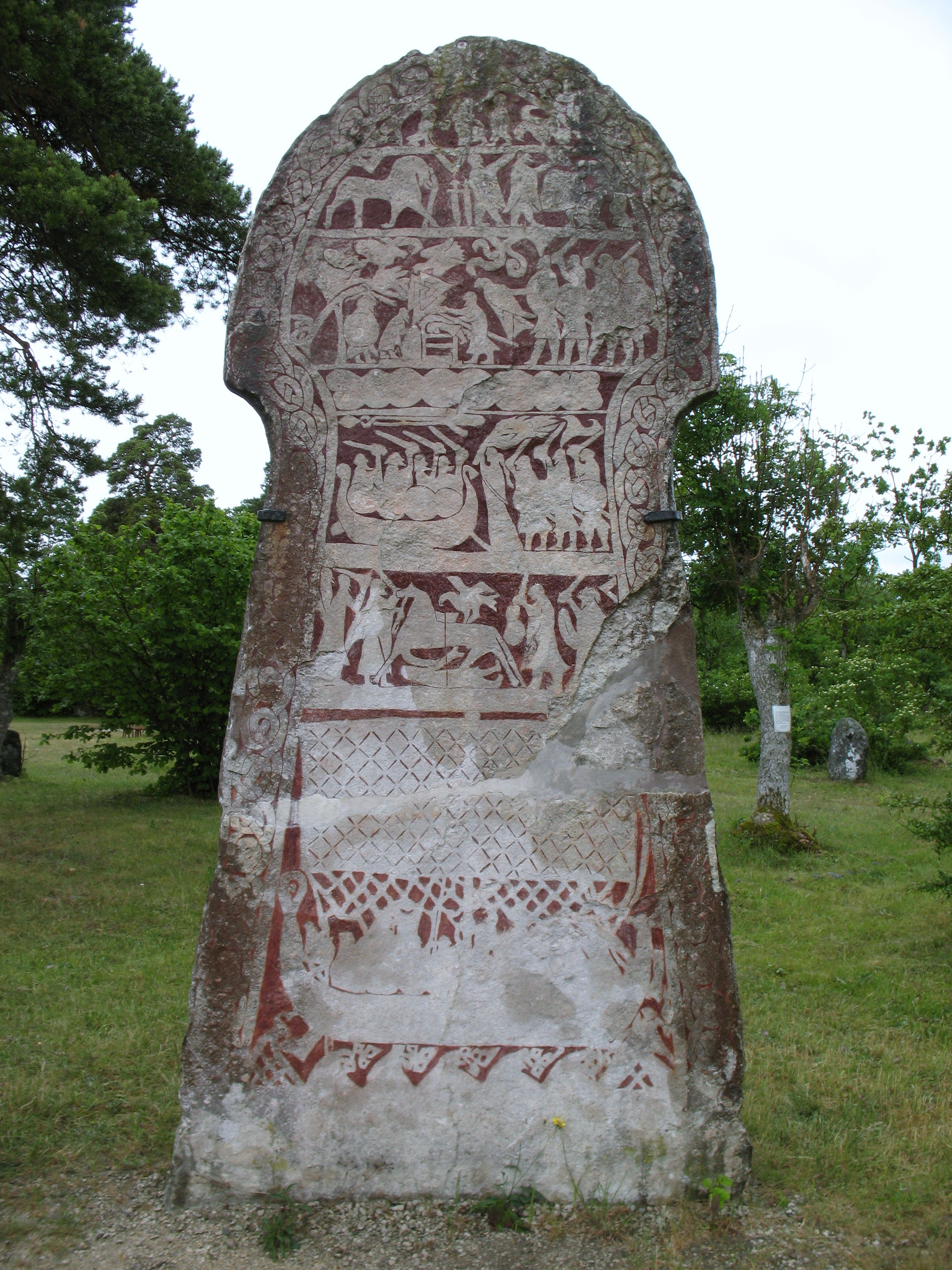
The Stora Hammars I stone.

A picture stone, image stone or figure stone is an ornate slab of stone, usually limestone, which was raised in Germanic Iron Age or Viking Age Scandinavia, and in the greatest number on Gotland. More than four hundred picture stones are known today. All of the stones were probably erected as memorial stones, but only rarely beside graves. Some of them have been positioned where many people could see them at bridges and on roads.

They mainly differ from runestones by presenting the message in pictures rather than runes. Some picture stones also have runic inscriptions, but they tell little more than to whom the stone was dedicated. Lacking textual explanations, the image stones are consequently difficult to interpret. Similar stones in Scotland are known as Pictish stones. The largest of the picture stones on Gotland is found in Änge in Buttle. It is 3.85 m (12.6 ft) tall and is richly ornamented in the style of the 8th century.

== Groups ==
The dating of the stones is based on studies of their shapes and ornamentations. Subsequently, three distinct groups of stones exist with various aesthetics, locations and purposes.

=== AD 400–600 ===
The first group of picture stones was made in the period 400–600. These have a straight form and the upper part is shaped like the edge of an axe. The ornamentations are usually circular forms with vortex patterns and spirals, but also with images of ships, people, and animals. These older stones were usually raised within grave fields, albeit not on the graves themselves.

=== AD 500–700 ===
The second group of picture stones come from the period 500–700, and they are small stones with stylized patterns.

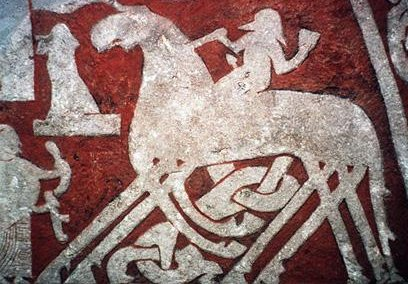
Detail of Odin entering Valhalla riding on Sleipnir from the Tjängvide image stone.

=== AD 700–1100 ===
The third group was made in the period 700–1100 and they consist of tall stones with necks and tall bow-shaped profiles. Their ornamentations present a rich array of pictures: ships with checkered sails and scenes with figures in different fields. The borders are often decorated with various plaited patterns. Many scenes show sacrifices and battles, and a common scene on the stones is a man, riding a horse, welcomed by a woman holding a drinking horn. What is seen are representations of a wealth of legends and myths. Sometimes depictions from Norse mythology and Norse legends can be identified, but largely the stories behind them have not survived in written form.

The image stones are valuable sources which complete knowledge from archaeology concerning ships and sails, and they provide information on armor, wagons, and sleighs. The later stones in this group feature an upper field with stylized cross and dragon patterns in the style of some runestones. These stones usually were raised on roads and at bridges to be visible.

== Isle of Man ==
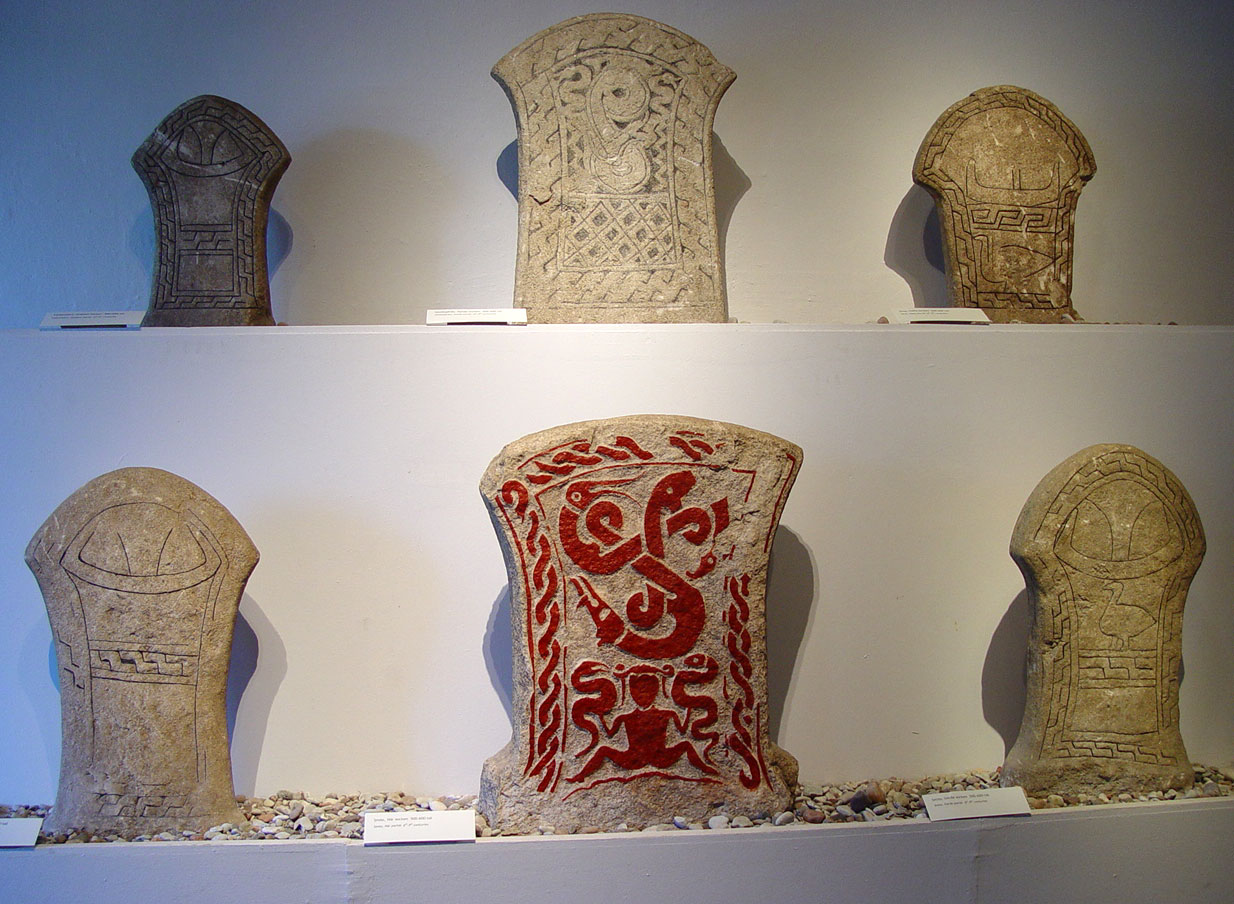
Image stones on display in Gotland Museum . The center bottom stone is known as the Snake-witch stone, featuring a figure holding snakes in each hand.

A comparable tradition is found on the Isle of Man where high funeral crosses of stone were richly ornamented with the same teeming world of warriors and Norse deities as the image stones of Gotland.

== Individual image stones ==
- Ardre stone
- Hunnestad Monument
- Ledberg stone
- Viking art
- The Snake-witch stone
- Stora Hammars stones
- Tängelgärda stone
