= Hungerford knot =

Type of heraldic knot

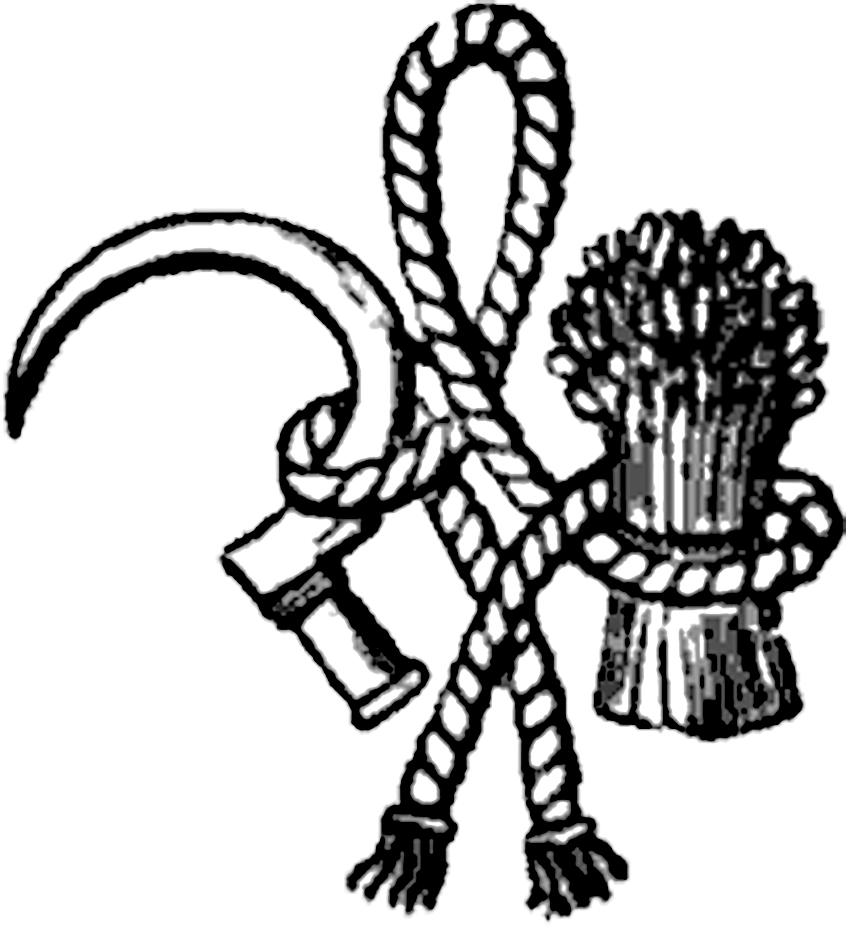
The heraldic badge of the Hastings family, with the so-called "Hastings knot" entwining a Hungerford sickle and a Peverell garb

The Hungerford or Hastings knot is a heraldic knot used as an heraldic badge in English heraldry by the Hungerford and Hastings families. The binding together of a Hungerford sickle and a Peverell garb (wheatsheaf) with the Hungerford knot commemorates the marriage between the Hungerfords and the Peverells in the early 15th century.
