= Heraldic knot =

Knot design in European heraldry

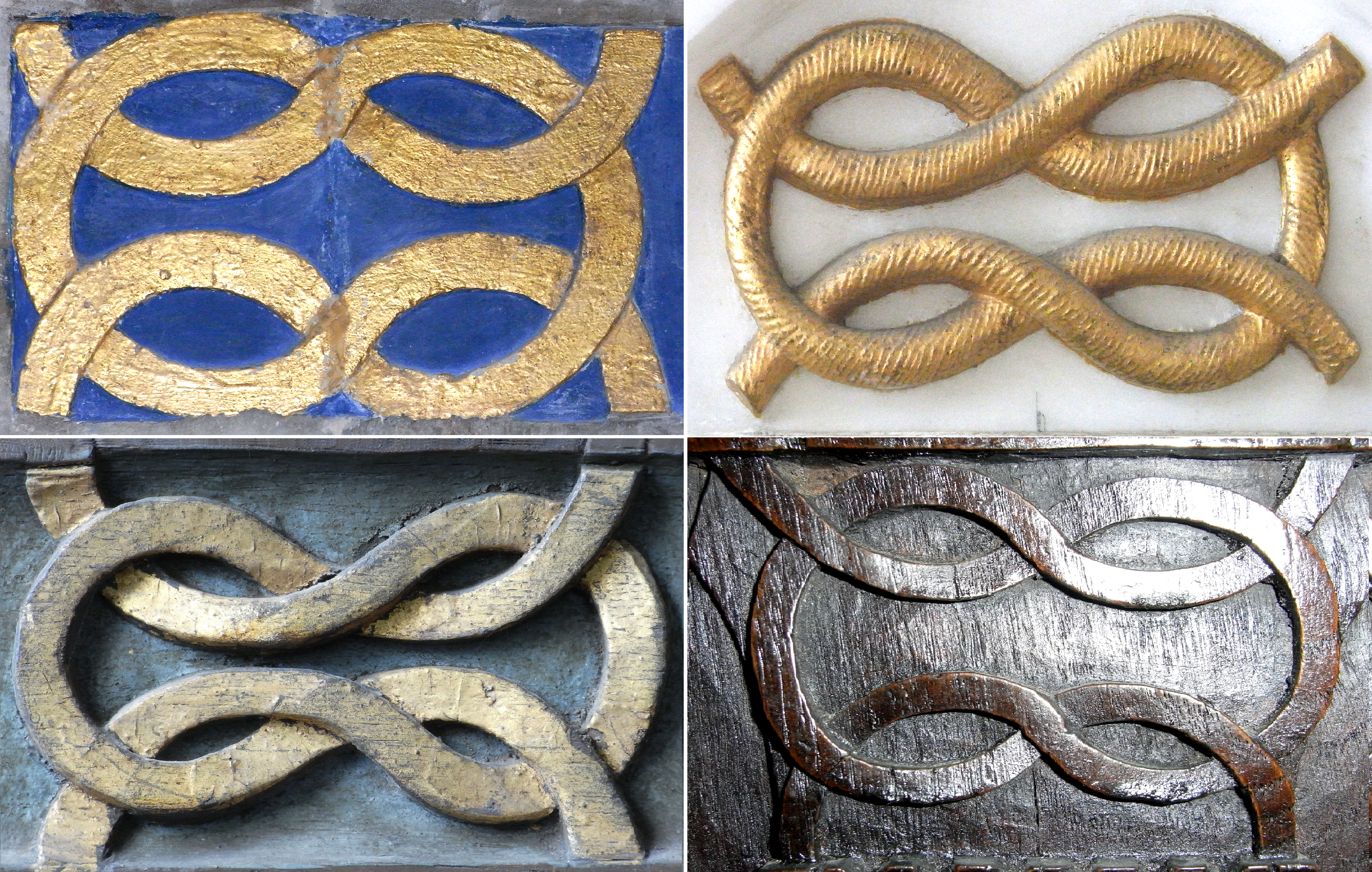
Bourchier knot compilation, Tawstock Church, Devon

A heraldic knot (referred to in heraldry as simply a knot) is a knot or design incorporating a knot used in European heraldry. While a given knot can be used on more than one family's achievement of arms, the family on whose coat the knot originated usually gives its name to the said knot (the exception being the Tristram knot). These knots can be used to charge shields and crests, but can also be used in badges or as standalone symbols of the families for whom they are named (like Scottish plaids). The simplest of these patterns, the Bowen knot, is often referred to as the heraldic knot in symbolism and art outside of heraldry.

== Heraldic knots ==
Example	Knot name	Description
	Bourchier knot	
	Bowen knot	
	Heneage knot	
	Lacy knot	
	Savoy knot	
	Wake knot	
	Harrington knot	Drawing of a heraldic knot consisting only of right angles, such that it looks like a square turned 45° on its side (so the corners point to the cardinal directions) with a cross (turned to resemble the letter 'X') going through the square which bisects each of the square's four sides.
