= Shackle =

Metal assembly which functions as a removable connecting link

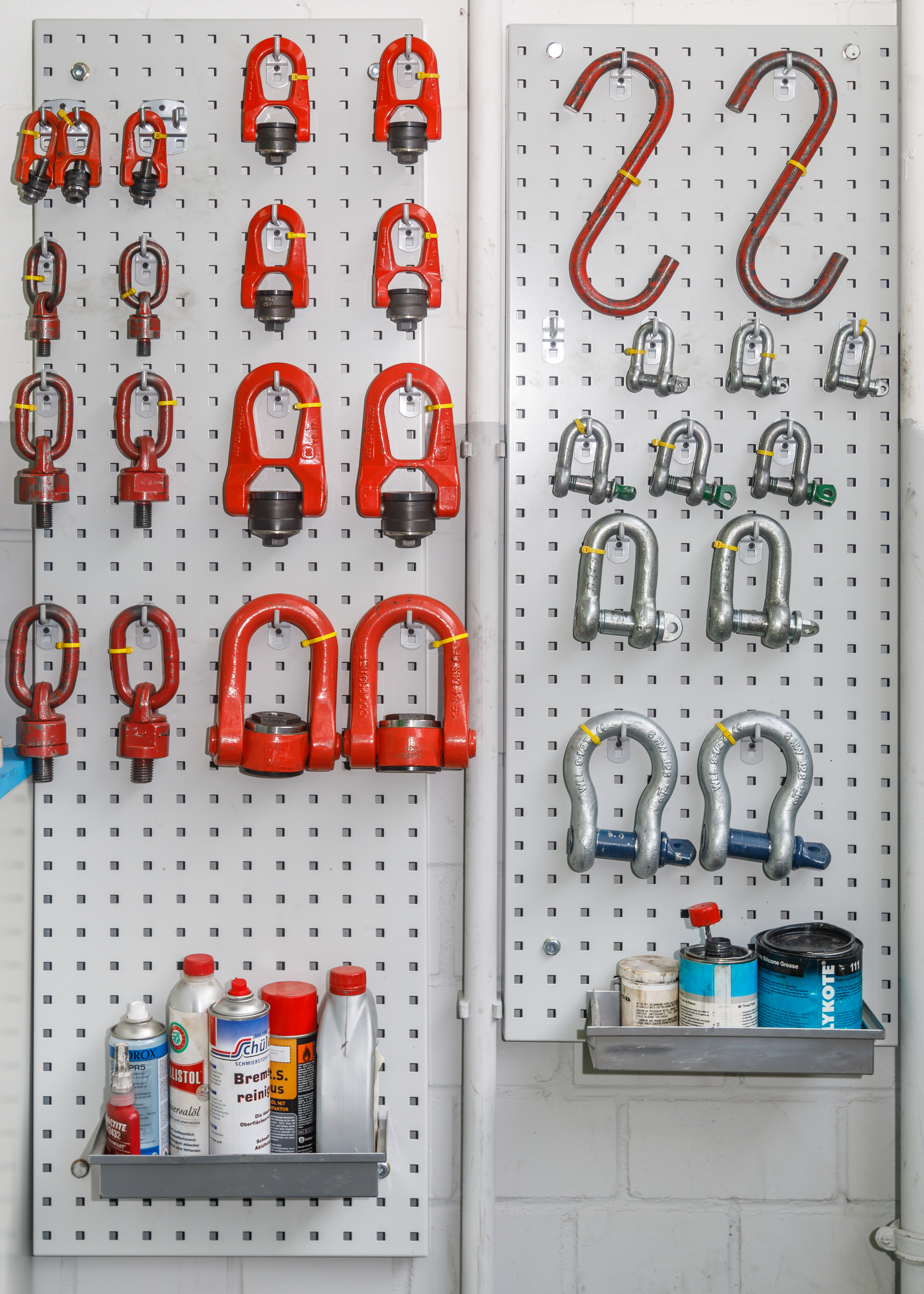
Different types of shackles. The yellow cable ties indicate the date of the last tool inspection.

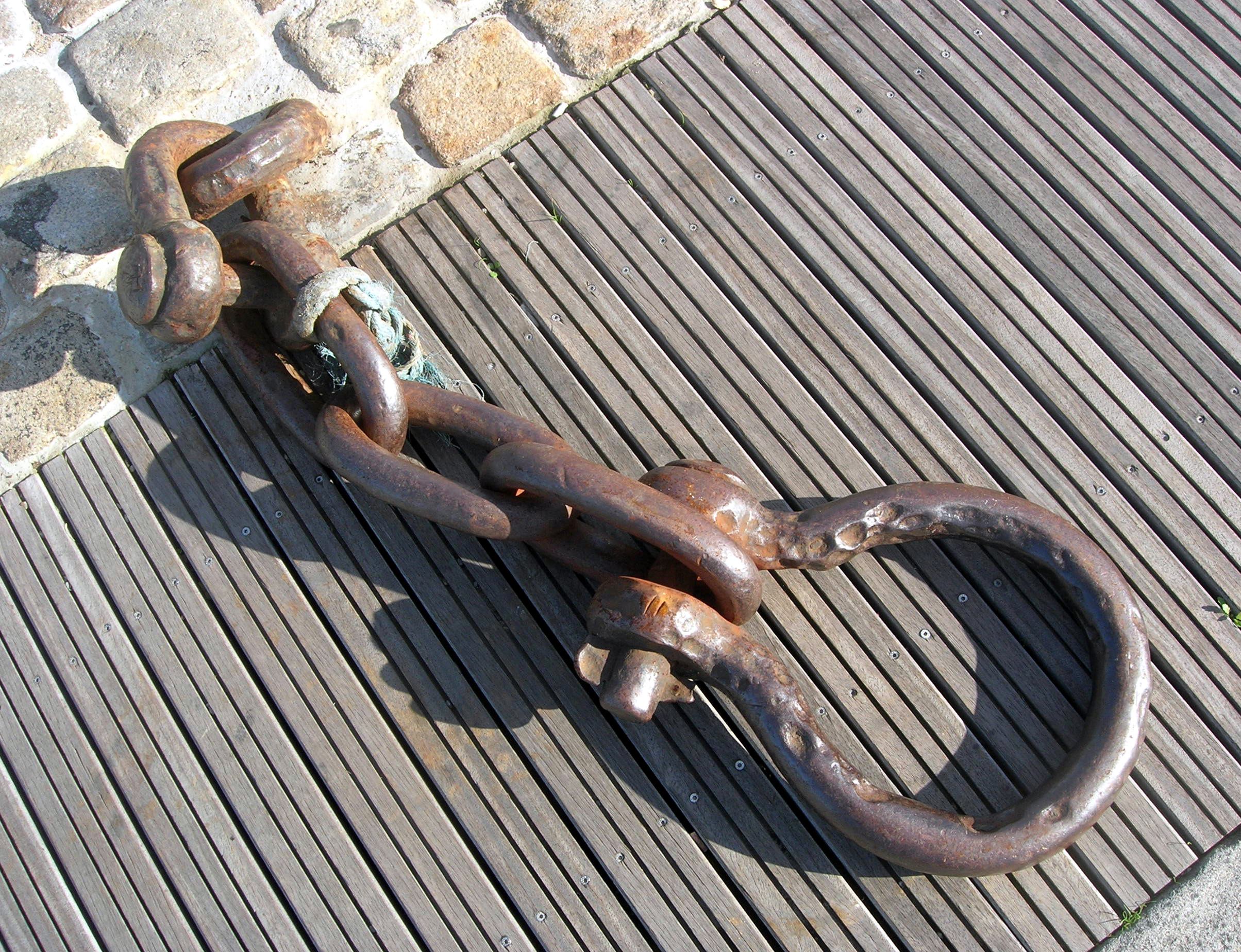
A well-used shackle.

A shackle (or shacklebolt), also known as a gyve, is a U-shaped piece of metal secured with a clevis pin or bolt across the opening, or a hinged metal loop secured with a quick-release locking pin mechanism. The term also applies to handcuffs and other similarly conceived restraint devices that function in a similar manner. Shackles are the primary connecting link in all manner of rigging systems, from boats and ships to industrial crane rigging, as they allow different rigging subsets to be connected or disconnected quickly.

A shackle is also the similarly shaped piece of metal used with a locking mechanism in padlocks. A carabiner is a type of shackle used in mountaineering.

== Types ==
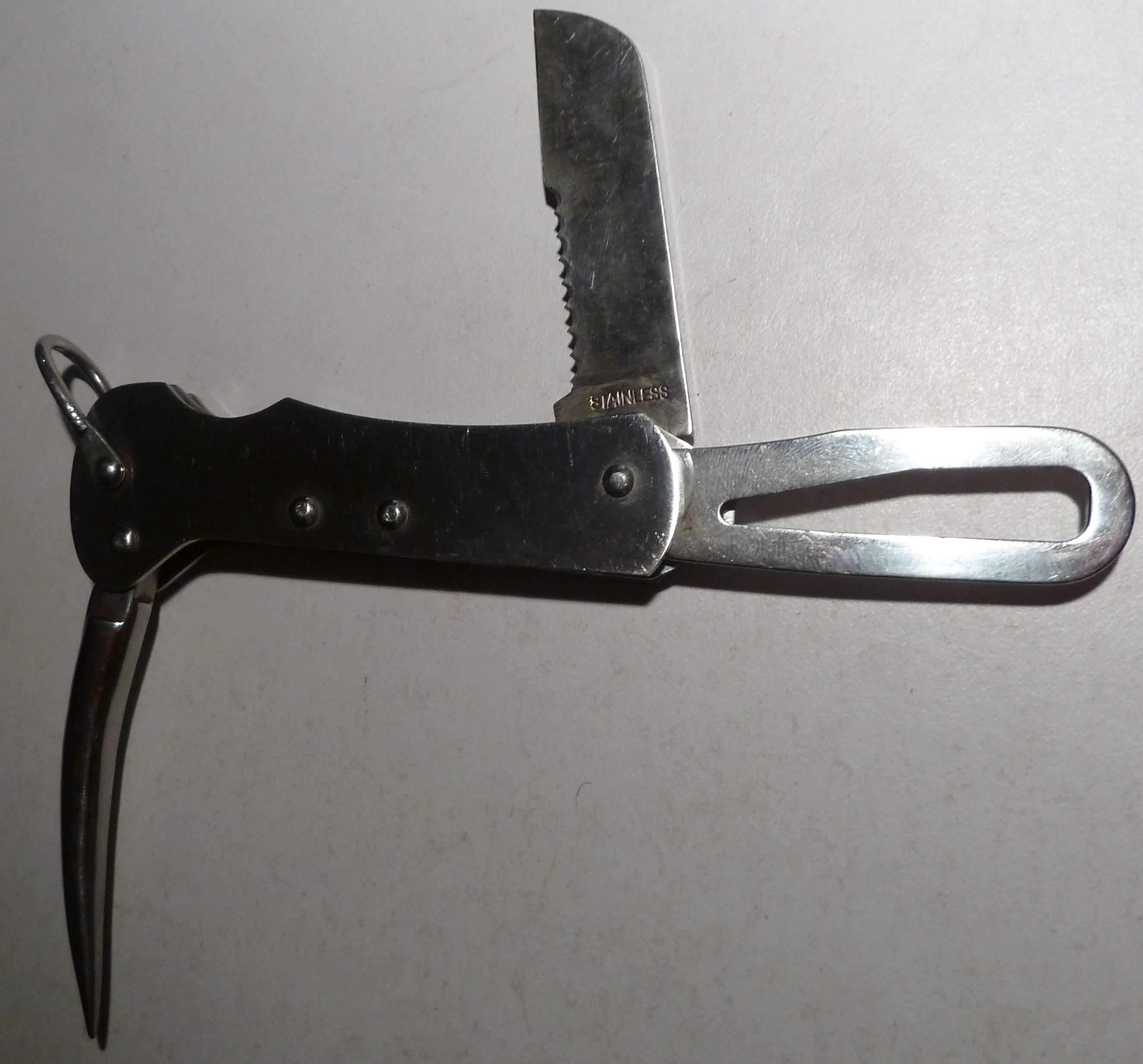
The shackle key (extended) of a marine multi-tool is used to unscrew threaded shackles.

=== Bow shackle ===
With a larger "O" shape to the loop, this shackle can take loads from many directions without developing as much side load. However, the larger shape to the loop does reduce its overall strength. Also referred to as an anchor shackle.

=== D-shackle ===
Also known as a chain shackle, D-shackles are narrow shackles shaped like a loop of chain, usually with a pin or threaded pin closure. D-shackles are very common and most other shackle types are a variation of the D-shackle. The small loop can take high loads primarily in line. Side and racking loads may twist or bend a D-shackle.

=== Headboard shackle ===
This longer version of a D-shackle is used to attach halyards to sails, especially sails fitted with a headboard such as on Bermuda rigged boats. Headboard shackles are often stamped from flat strap stainless steel, and feature an additional pin between the top of the loop and the bottom so the headboard does not chafe the spliced eye of the halyard.

=== Pin shackle ===
A pin shackle is closed with an anchor bolt and cotter pin, in a manner similar to a clevis. It is for this reason they are often referred to, in industrial jargon, as clevises. Pin shackles can be inconvenient to work with, at times, as the bolt will need to be secured to the shackle body to avoid its loss, usually with a split pin or seizing wire. A more secure version used in crane rigging features the combination of a securing nut (hardware) located alongside the cotter pin. Pin shackles are practical in many rigging applications where the anchor bolt is expected to experience some rotation.

=== Snap shackle ===
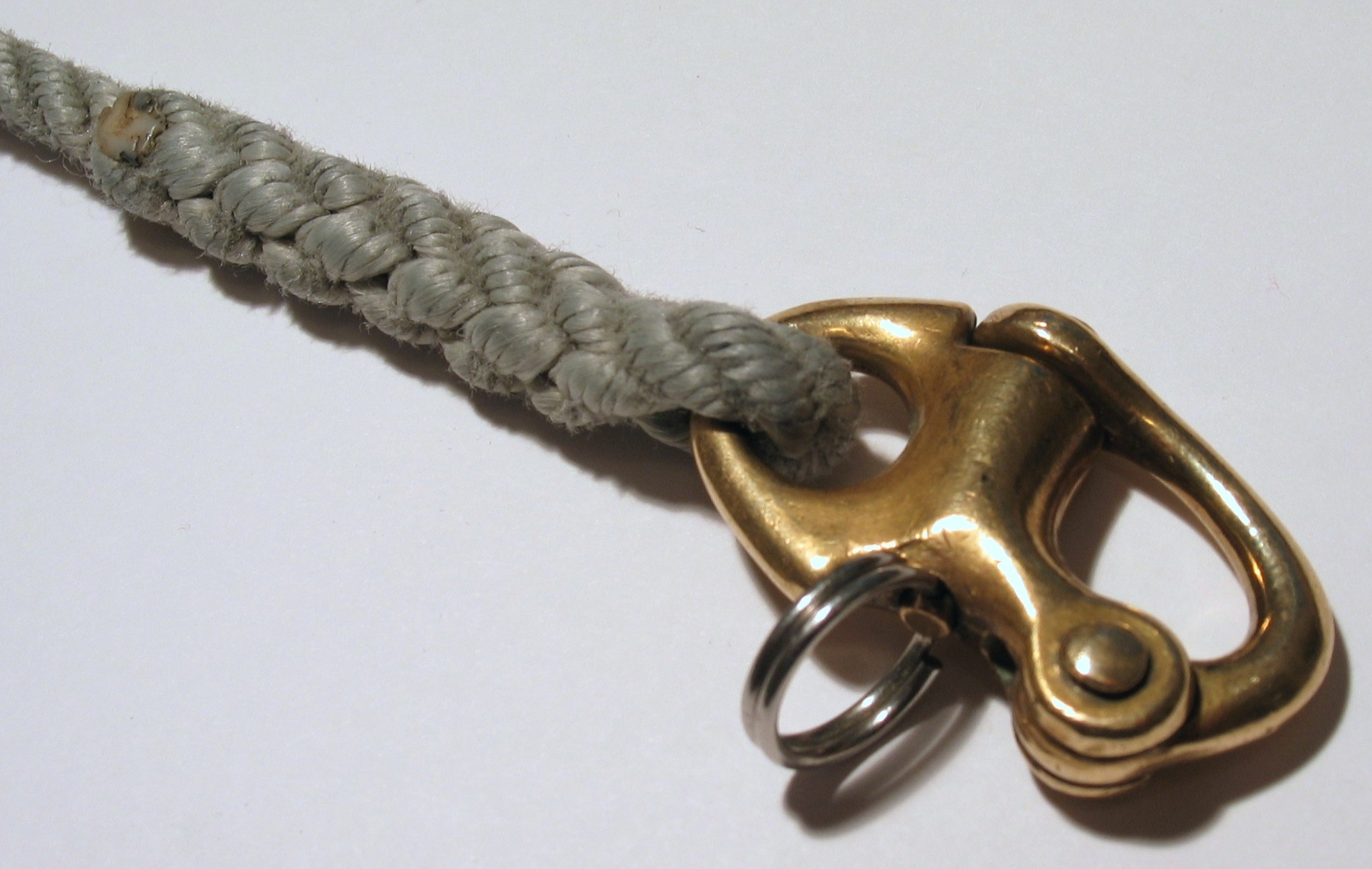
A snap shackle spliced to a line.

As the name implies, a snap shackle is a fast action fastener which can be implemented single-handedly. It uses a spring-activated locking mechanism to close a hinged shackle, and can be unfastened under load. This is a potential safety hazard, but can also be extremely useful at times. The snap shackle is not as secure as any other form of shackle, but can come in handy for temporary uses or in situations which must be moved or replaced often, such as a sailor's harness tether or to attach spinnaker sheets. Note: When this type of shackle is used to release a significant load, it will work rather poorly (hard to release) and is likely to have the pin assembly or the split ring fail.

=== Threaded shackle ===
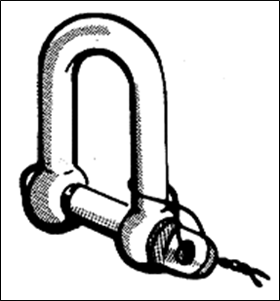
A moused shackle

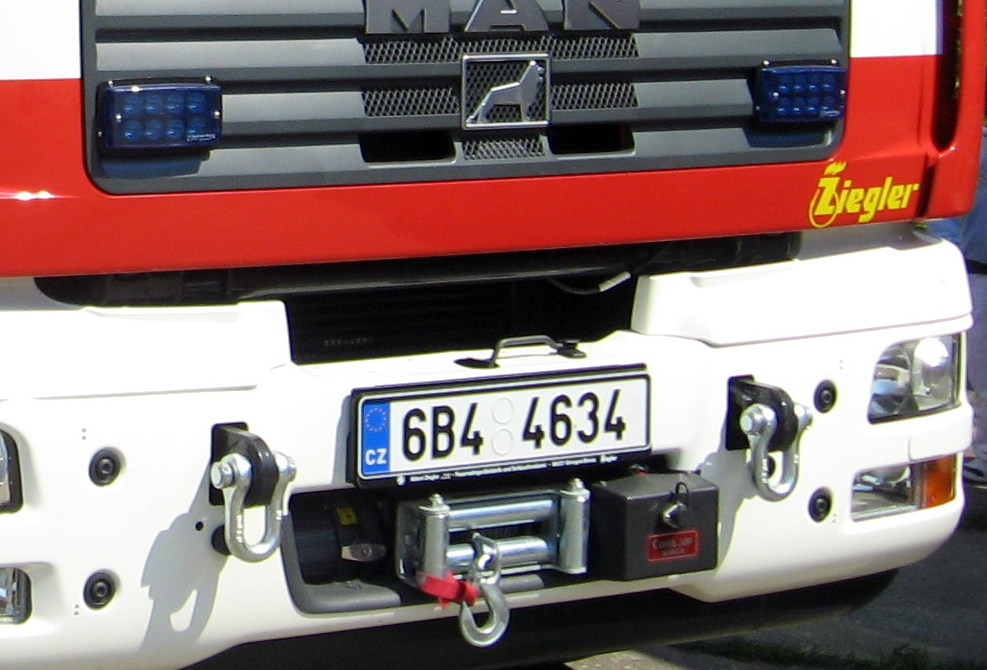
Front of a MAN-based fire engine with two mounted threaded shackles and a winch

The pin is threaded and one leg of the shackle is tapped. The pin may be captive, which means it is mated to the shackle, usually with a wire. The threads may gall if overtightened or have been corroding in salty air, so a liberal coating of lanolin or a heavy grease is not out of place on any and all threads. A shackle key or metal marlinspike are useful tools for loosening a tight nut.

For safety, it is common to mouse a threaded shackle to keep the pin from coming loose. This is done by looping mousing wire or a nylon zip tie through the hole in the pin and around the shackle body. For pins that have a cross-hole in the threaded end a cotter pin can be used. One disadvantage of wire is that mousing can introduce galvanic corrosion because of material differences; it is especially bad when used in places where the shackle is exposed to air and water. Nylon is not recommended for use where significant movement of the shackle is expected.

=== Twist shackle ===
A twist shackle is usually somewhat longer than the average, and features a 90° twist so the top of the loop is perpendicular to the pin. One of the uses for this shackle include attaching the jib halyard block to the mast, or the jib halyard to the sail, to reduce twist on the luff and allow the sail

=== Soft shackle ===
Modern strong fibers such as PBO (IUPAC name: poly(p-phenylene-2,6-benzobisoxazole), aramids (Kevlar, Technora, Twaron), Vectran, carbon fibers, ultra-high-molecular-weight polyethylene (UHMWPE, Dyneema, Spectra) and other synthetic fibers are used to make extra strong ropes which can also be tied into lockable loops called soft shackles.

According to sailmagazine.com, "a soft shackle can handle just about every function performed by a metal shackle, in many cases better. Soft shackles articulate better, don’t rattle around when not under load, don’t chew up toe rails or beat up masts and decks, don’t hurt when they whack you on the head, are easier to undo and don’t have pins that fall overboard at a critical moment". A modern rope can lift as heavy loads as a steel wire 3 times as thick and much heavier. Metal shackles may be preferred because soft shackles can be cut by sharp edges, burned, or deteriorate in some environments.

One disadvantage of soft shackles made of Dyneema and other modern fibers is their susceptibility to be weakened by heat, also heat caused by friction. It is advisable to subject it to medium level loads for a while to remove any slack that may cause friction heat when loaded to its maximum.

The stopping knot of a soft shackle may be a true lover's knot, a diamond knot, a double line celtic button knot or a chinese button knot (ABOK #600, ABOK #601, ABOK #603 doubled as one tail-end reverse-trails the other, emerging tail-ends preferably buried in the opposing main part as it emerges together from the knot for Chinese finger trap attachment). Another preferred stopping knot is a two rope combined wall+crown+wall+crown knot (a two string rose knot). The latter ones with the added thickness of the returning tail ends have the advantage of less of a sharp curvature at their weakest spot, the eye around the neck of the button.

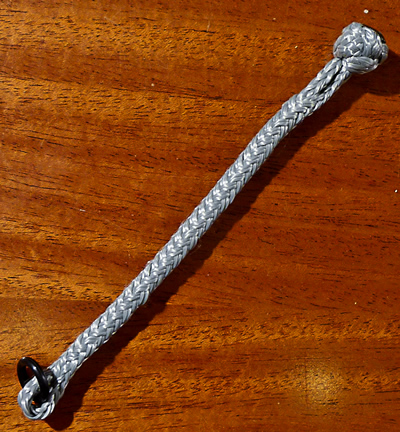
Fully buried Dyneema soft shackle open, eye with ring closed

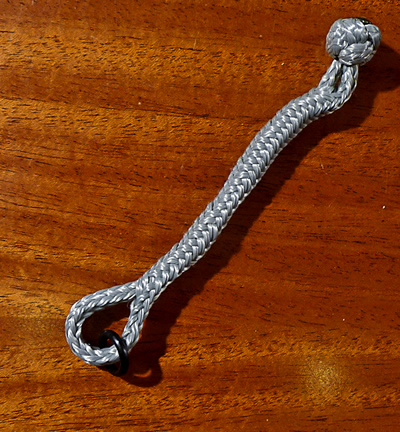
Dyneema soft shackle open, eye opened using the ring

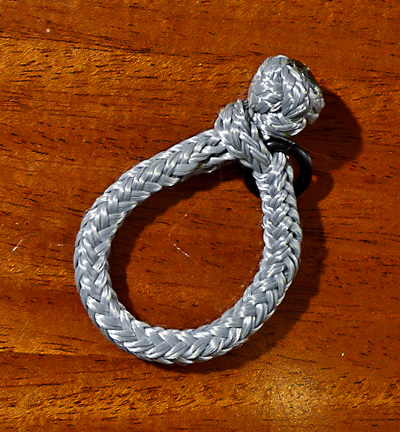
Dyneema soft shackle with diamond knot head locked

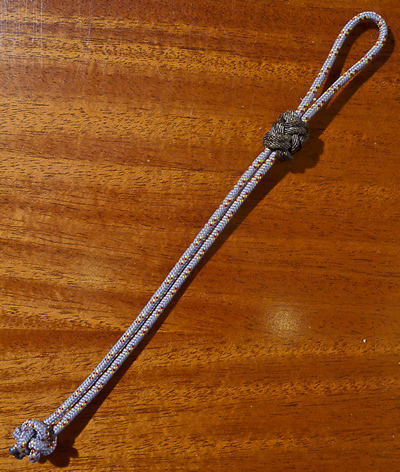
Soft shackle with diamond knot head, and Turks head collar open

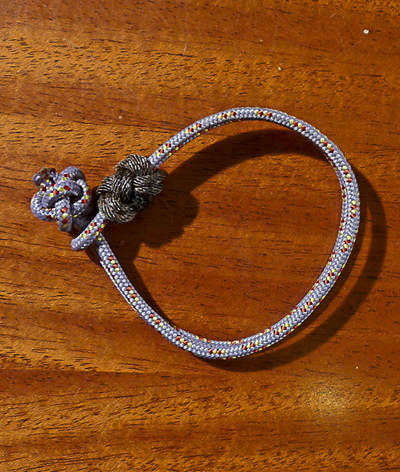
Soft shackle with diamond knot head, and Turks head collar locked

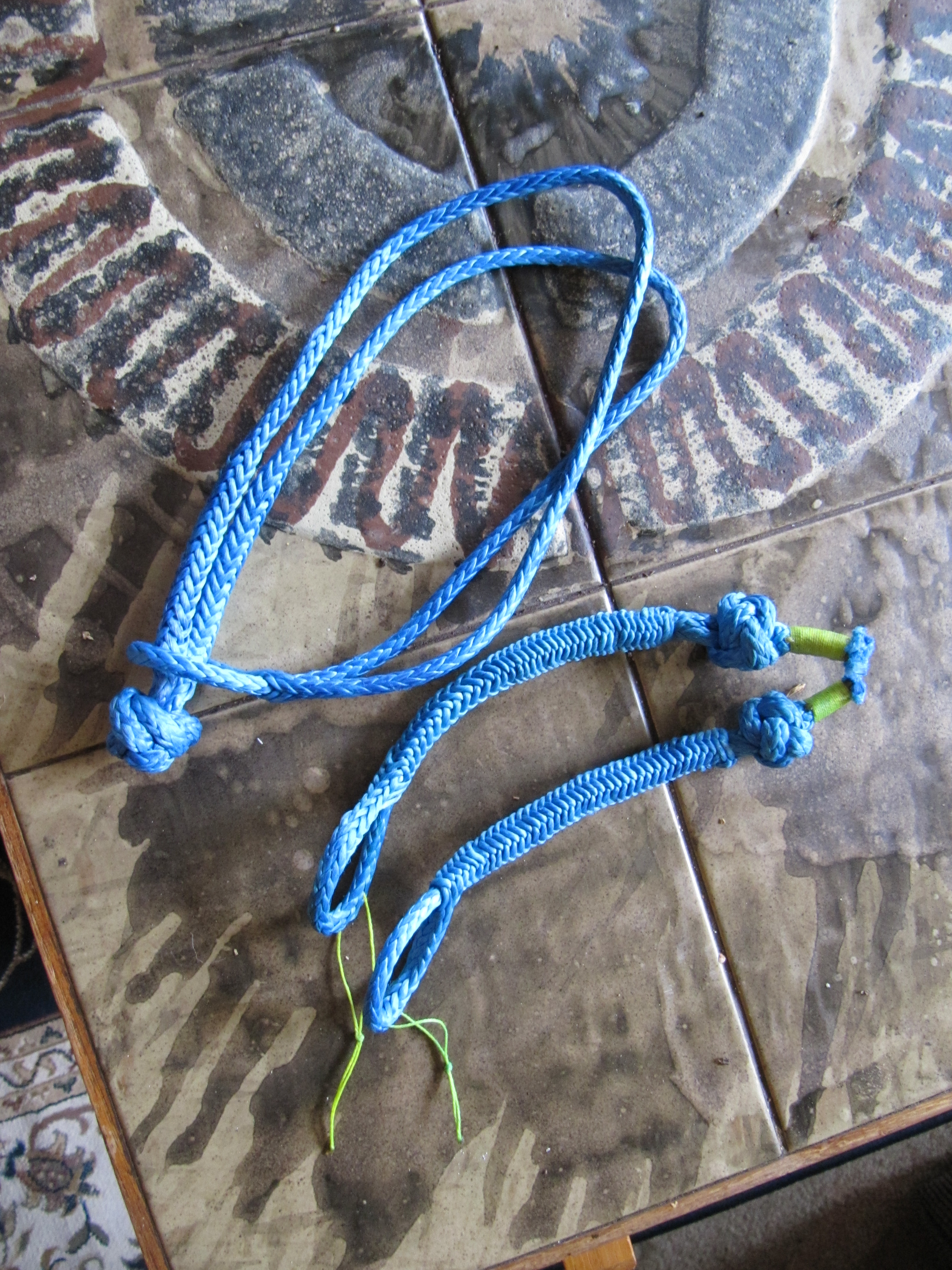
Two with diamond knot head, and buried eye with opening string, one with ends-buried-button-knot and eye adjustable by crossing sides.

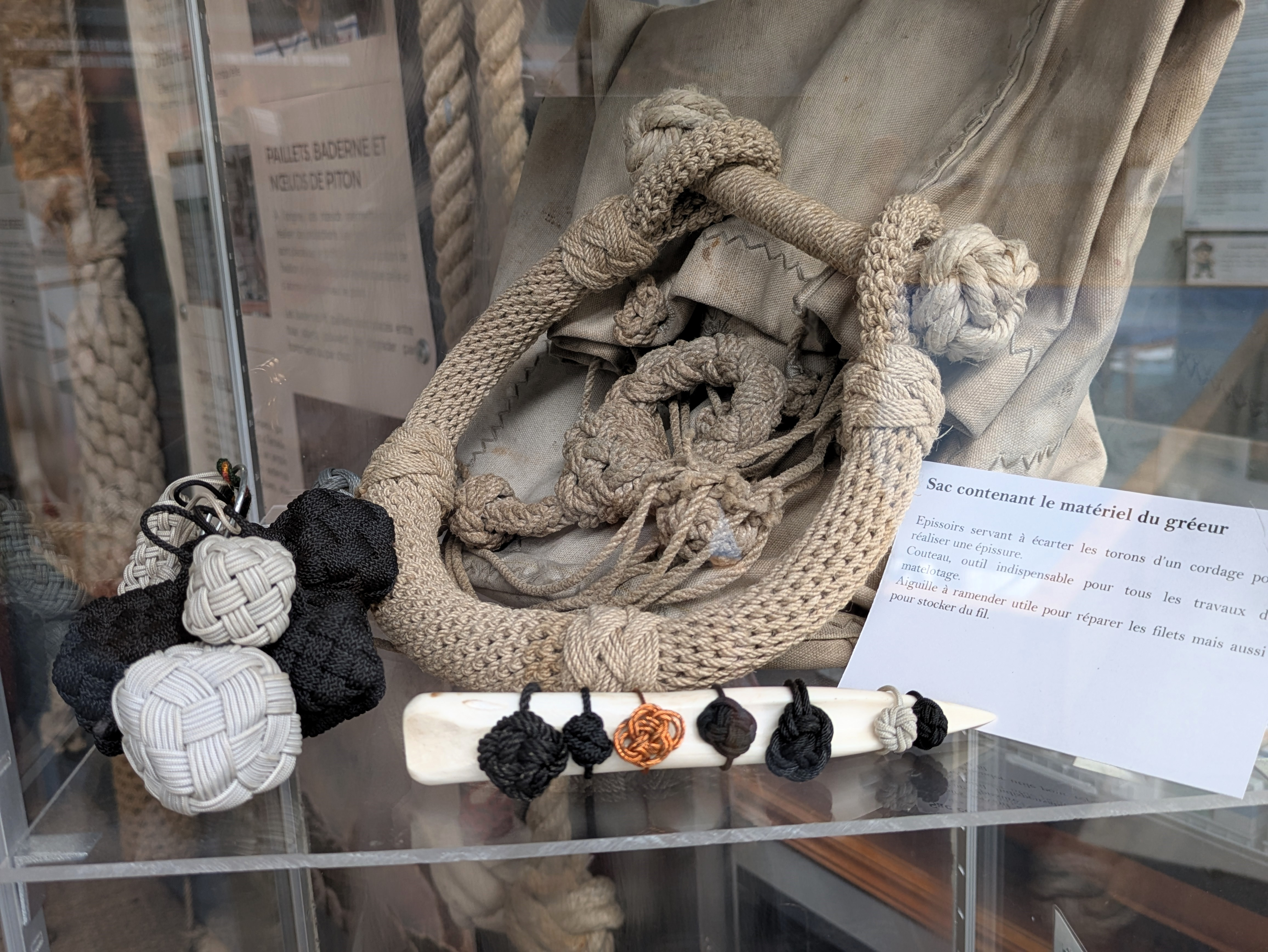
Rope shackle, probably made for the museum exhibition.
