= Diamond knot =

Type of knot

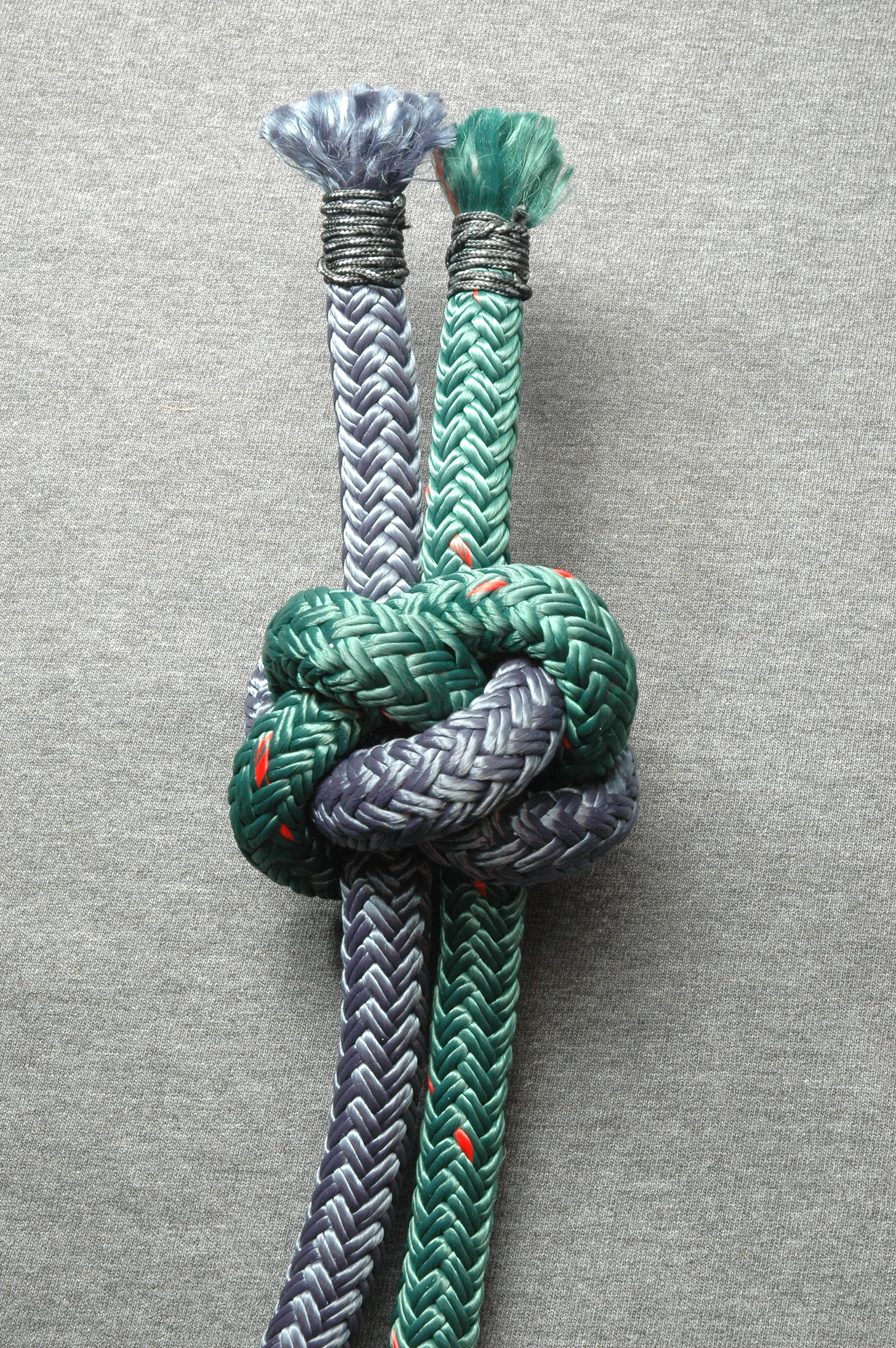
- Names: Diamond knot, Knife lanyard knot, Sailor's knife lanyard knot, Marlinspike lanyard knot, Single-strand diamond knot, Two-strand diamond knot, Bosun's whistle knot, Friendship knot
- Category: Loop
- Related: Carrick bend, Fiador knot, Chinese button knot
- ABoK: #787, #2474

The diamond knot (or knife lanyard knot) is a knot for forming a decorative loop on the end of a cord such as on a lanyard. A similar knot, also called the diamond knot, is a multistrand stopper knot, that is similar in appearance (although the footrope knot is really more similar, but it is simply an upside down diamond knot). Some people recommend calling this knot the knife lanyard knot in order to avoid confusion. This knot is a four strand diamond knot implemented in two strands. The knife lanyard knot and Chinese button knot are "tied alike, but they are worked differently." This knot is also used in Prayer ropes by Eastern Christians, who accredit the knot's creation to a legend relating to Saint Anthony the Great.

The sailor's knife lanyard knot, also called marling-spike lanyard knot, single-strand diamond knot, two-strand diamond knot, and Bosun's whistle knot.

— The Ashley Book of Knots

== Tying ==
The diamond knot begins as a Carrick bend with the ends exiting diagonally opposite each other. When the steps below are completed the knot is rearranged and tightened so that the ends emerge from the knot parallel and opposite their own standing part. A Chinese button knot is often tied in a very similar manner, but without leaving a loop at the end.

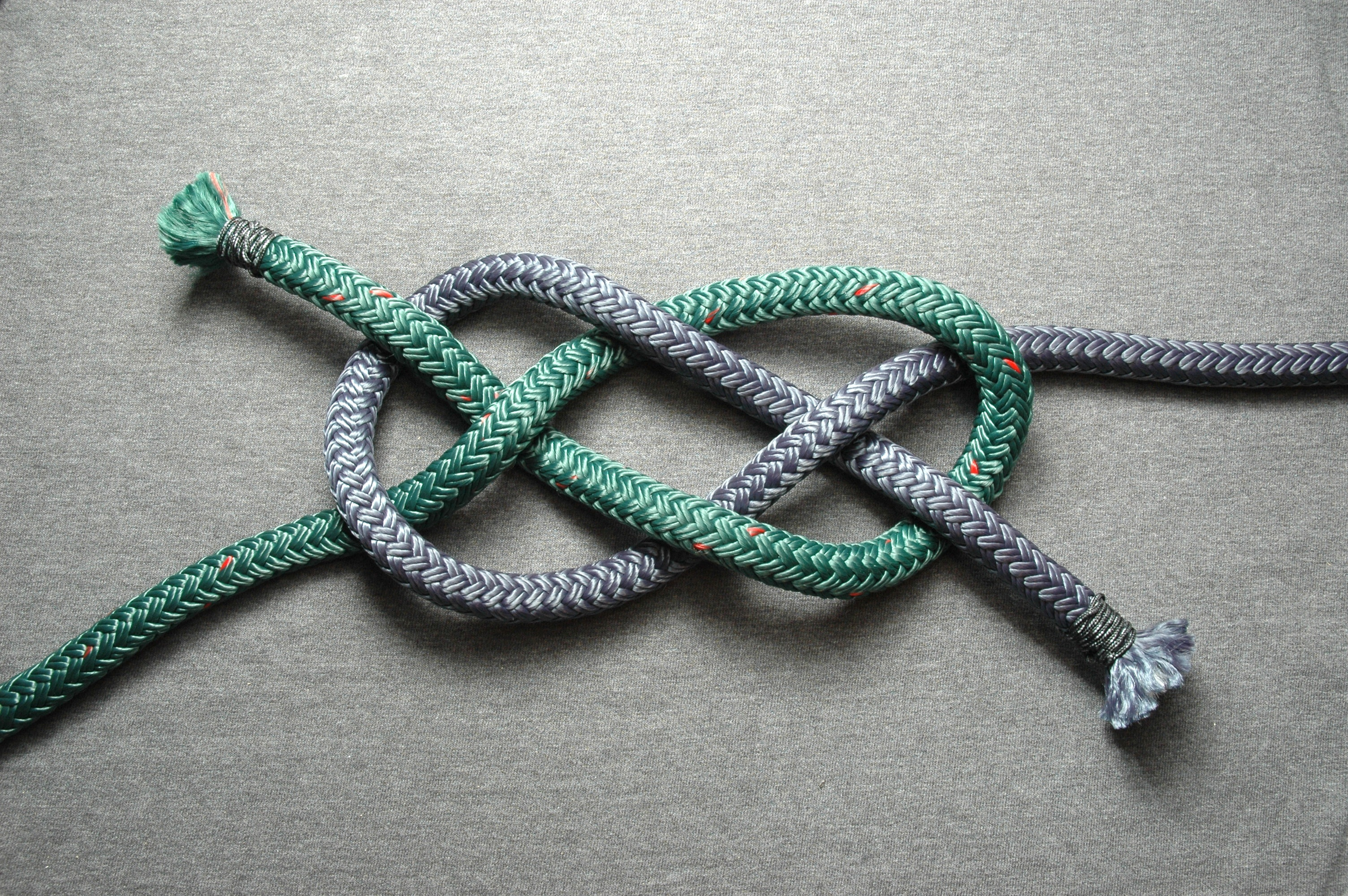
Carrick bend start

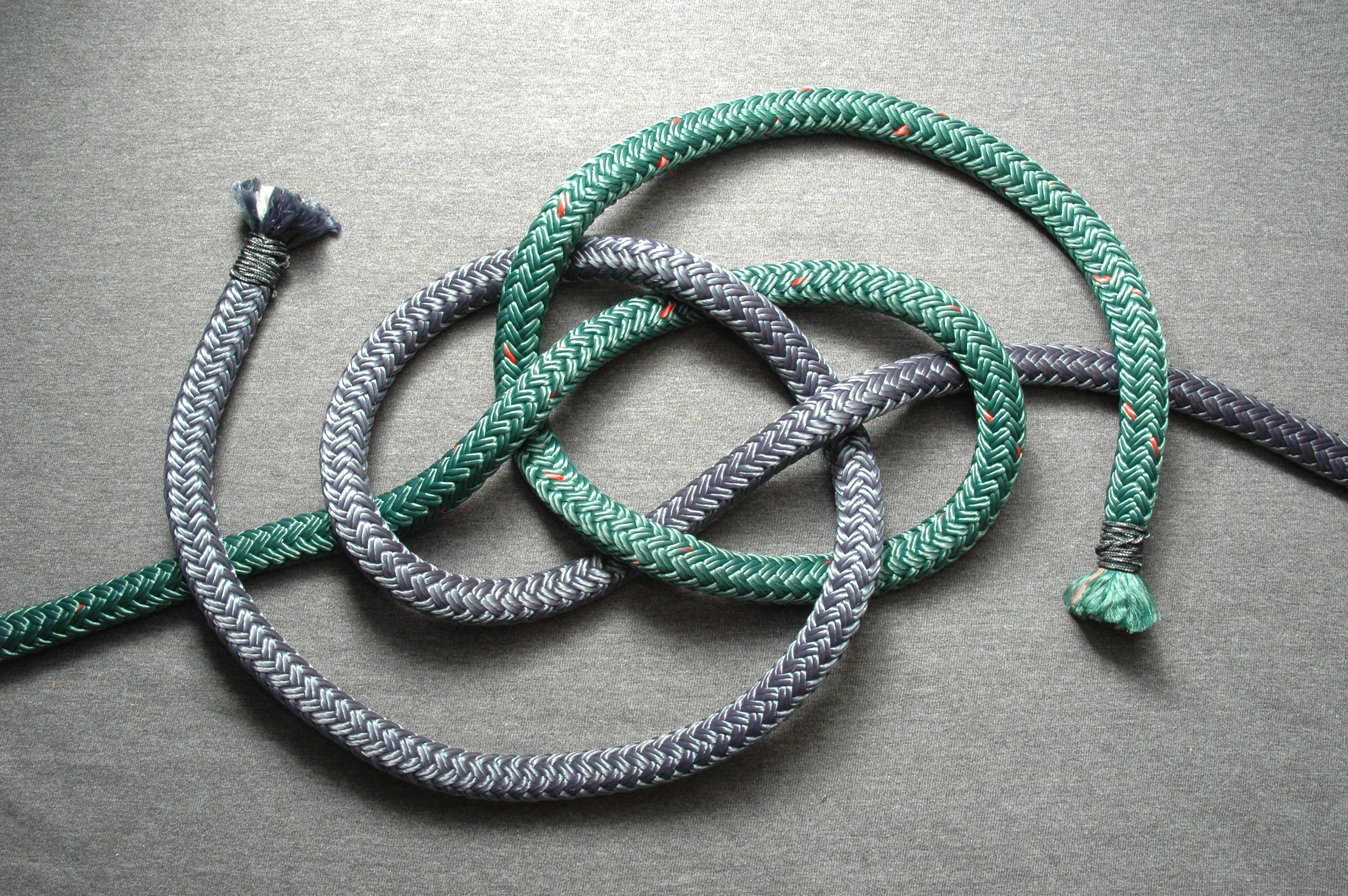
Working ends passed over each other's standing parts

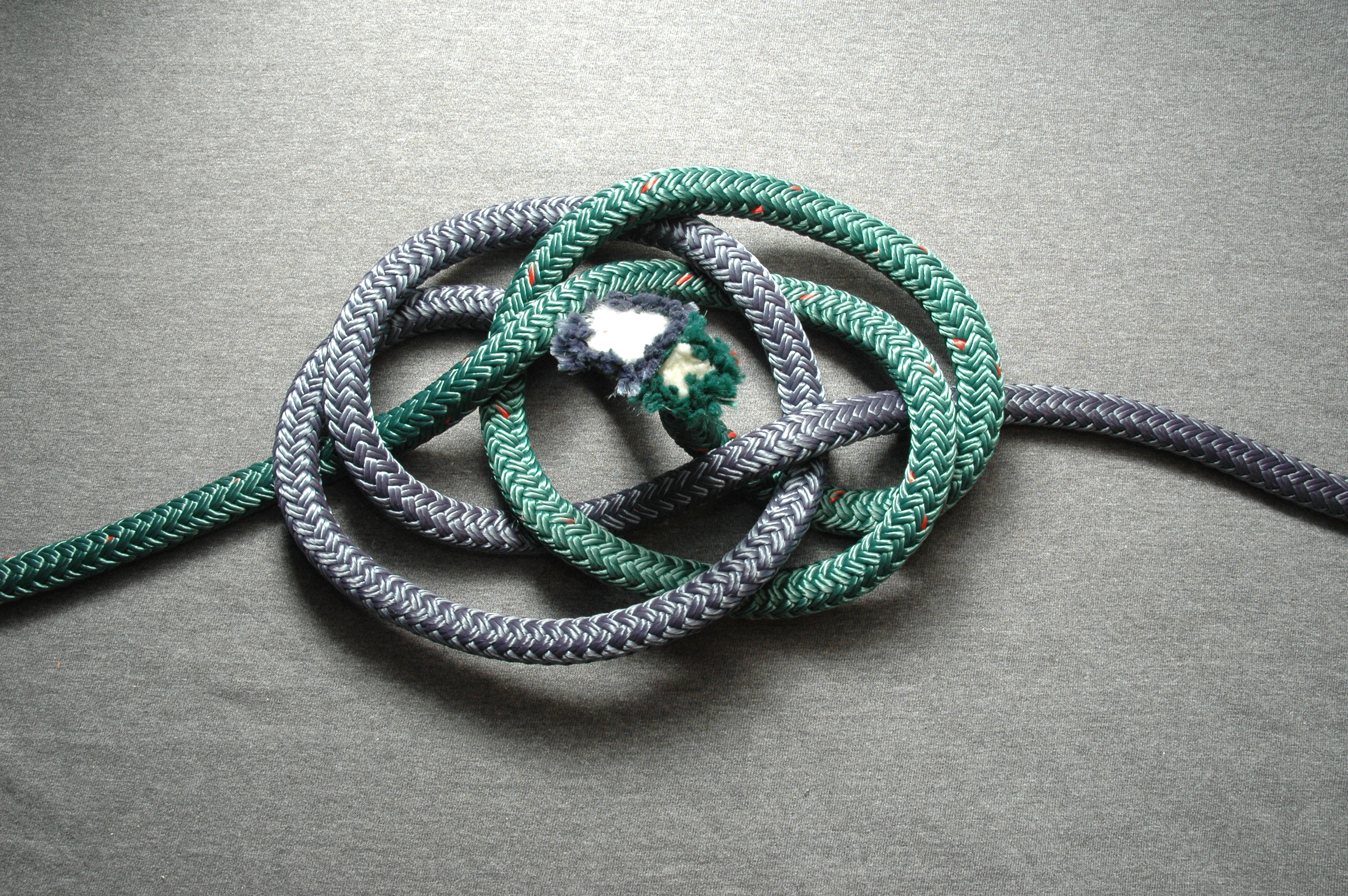
The ends are passed up through the center of the carrick bend from below.

== See also ==
- List of knots
- Friendship knot
- MV Diamond Knot
- Diamond Knot Killer
