= List of prime knots =

In knot theory, prime knots are those knots that are indecomposable under the operation of knot sum. The prime knots with ten or fewer crossings are listed here for quick comparison of their properties and varied naming schemes.

== Table of prime knots ==
=== Six or fewer crossings ===
Name	Picture	Alexander– Briggs– Rolfsen	Dowker– Thistlethwaite	Dowker notation	Conway notation	crossinglist
Unknot		0_{1}	0a1	—	—	0
Trefoil knot		3_{1}	3a1	4 6 2	[3]	123:123
Figure-eight knot		4_{1}	4a1	4 6 8 2	[22]	1234:2143 1231\4324
Cinquefoil knot		5_{1}	5a2	6 8 10 2 4	[5]	12345:12345
Three-twist knot		5_{2}	5a1	4 8 10 2 6	[32]	12345:12543 1231\452354
Stevedore knot		6_{1}	6a3	4 8 12 10 2 6	[42]	123456:216543 1231\45632654
6_{2} knot		6_{2}	6a2	4 8 10 12 2 6	[312]	123456:234165 1231\45632456
6_{3} knot		6_{3}	6a1	4 8 10 2 12 6	[2112]	123456:236145 1231\45642356 1231\45236456
Ref:

=== Seven crossings ===
Picture	Alexander– Briggs– Rolfsen	Dowker– Thistlethwaite	Dowker notation	Conway notation	crossinglist
	7_{1}	7a7	8 10 12 14 2 4 6	[7]	1-7:1-7
	7_{2}	7a4	4 10 14 12 2 8 6	[52]	1-7:127-3
	7_{3}	7a5	6 10 12 14 2 4 8	[43]	
	7_{4}	7a6	6 10 12 14 4 2 8	[313]	
	7_{5}	7a3	4 10 12 14 2 8 6	[322]	
	7_{6}	7a2	4 8 12 2 14 6 10	[2212]	
	7_{7}	7a1	4 8 10 12 2 14 6	[21112]	

=== Eight crossings ===
Picture	Alexander– Briggs– Rolfsen	Dowker– Thistlethwaite	Dowker notation	Conway notation
	8_{1}	8a11	4 10 16 14 12 2 8 6	[62]
	8_{2}	8a8	4 10 12 14 16 2 6 8	[512]
	8_{3}	8a18	6 12 10 16 14 4 2 8	[44]
	8_{4}	8a17	6 10 12 16 14 4 2 8	[413]
	8_{5}	8a13	6 8 12 2 14 16 4 10	[3,3,2]
	8_{6}	8a10	4 10 14 16 12 2 8 6	[332]
	8_{7}	8a6	4 10 12 14 2 16 6 8	[4112]
	8_{8}	8a4	4 8 12 2 16 14 6 10	[2312]
	8_{9}	8a16	6 10 12 14 16 4 2 8	[3113]
	8_{10}	8a3	4 8 12 2 14 16 6 10	[3,21,2]
	8_{11}	8a9	4 10 12 14 16 2 8 6	[3212]
	8_{12}	8a5	4 8 14 10 2 16 6 12	[2222]
	8_{13}	8a7	4 10 12 14 2 16 8 6	[31112]
	8_{14}	8a1	4 8 10 14 2 16 6 12	[22112]
	8_{15}	8a2	4 8 12 2 14 6 16 10	[21,21,2]
	8_{16}	8a15	6 8 14 12 4 16 2 10	[.2.20]
	8_{17}	8a14	6 8 12 14 4 16 2 10	[.2.2]
	8_{18}	8a12	6 8 10 12 14 16 2 4	[8*]
	8_{19}	8n3	4 8 -12 2 -14 -16 -6 -10	[3,3,2-]
	8_{20}	8n1	4 8 -12 2 -14 -6 -16 -10	[3,21,2-]
	8_{21}	8n2	4 8 -12 2 14 -6 16 10	[21,21,2-]

=== Nine crossings ===
Picture	Alexander– Briggs– Rolfsen	Dowker– Thistlethwaite	Dowker notation	Conway notation
	9_{1}	9a41	10 12 14 16 18 2 4 6 8	[9]
	9_{2}	9a27	4 12 18 16 14 2 10 8 6	[72]
	9_{3}	9a38	8 12 14 16 18 2 4 6 10	[63]
	9_{4}	9a35	6 12 14 18 16 2 4 10 8	[54]
	9_{5}	9a36	6 12 14 18 16 4 2 10 8	[513]
	9_{6}	9a23	4 12 14 16 18 2 10 6 8	[522]
	9_{7}	9a26	4 12 16 18 14 2 10 8 6	[342]
	9_{8}	9a8	4 8 14 2 18 16 6 12 10	[2412]
	9_{9}	9a33	6 12 14 16 18 2 4 10 8	[423]
	9_{10}	9a39	8 12 14 16 18 2 6 4 10	[333]
	9_{11}	9a20	4 10 14 16 12 2 18 6 8	[4122]
	9_{12}	9a22	4 10 16 14 2 18 8 6 12	[4212]
	9_{13}	9a34	6 12 14 16 18 4 2 10 8	[3213]
	9_{14}	9a17	4 10 12 16 14 2 18 8 6	[41112]
	9_{15}	9a10	4 8 14 10 2 18 16 6 12	[2322]
	9_{16}	9a25	4 12 16 18 14 2 8 10 6	[3,3,2+]
	9_{17}	9a14	4 10 12 14 16 2 6 18 8	[21312]
	9_{18}	9a24	4 12 14 16 18 2 10 8 6	[3222]
	9_{19}	9a3	4 8 10 14 2 18 16 6 12	[23112]
	9_{20}	9a19	4 10 14 16 2 18 8 6 12	[31212]
	9_{21}	9a21	4 10 14 16 12 2 18 8 6	[31122]
	9_{22}	9a2	4 8 10 14 2 16 18 6 12	[211,3,2]
	9_{23}	9a16	4 10 12 16 2 8 18 6 14	[22122]
	9_{24}	9a7	4 8 14 2 16 18 6 12 10	[3,21,2+]
	9_{25}	9a4	4 8 12 2 16 6 18 10 14	[22,21,2]
	9_{26}	9a15	4 10 12 14 16 2 18 8 6	[311112]
	9_{27}	9a12	4 10 12 14 2 18 16 6 8	[212112]
	9_{28}	9a5	4 8 12 2 16 14 6 18 10	[21,21,2+]
	9_{29}	9a31	6 10 14 18 4 16 8 2 12	[.2.20.2]
	9_{30}	9a1	4 8 10 14 2 16 6 18 12	[211,21,2]
	9_{31}	9a13	4 10 12 14 2 18 16 8 6	[2111112]
	9_{32}	9a6	4 8 12 14 2 16 18 10 6	[.21.20]
	9_{33}	9a11	4 8 14 12 2 16 18 10 6	[.21.2]
	9_{34}	9a28	6 8 10 16 14 18 4 2 12	[8*20]
	9_{35}	9a40	8 12 16 14 18 4 2 6 10	[3,3,3]
	9_{36}	9a9	4 8 14 10 2 16 18 6 12	[22,3,2]
	9_{37}	9a18	4 10 14 12 16 2 6 18 8	[3,21,21]
	9_{38}	9a30	6 10 14 18 4 16 2 8 12	[.2.2.2]
	9_{39}	9a32	6 10 14 18 16 2 8 4 12	[2:2:20]
	9_{40}	9a27	6 16 14 12 4 2 18 10 8	[9*]
	9_{41}	9a29	6 10 14 12 16 2 18 4 8	[20:20:20]
	9_{42}	9n4	4 8 10 −14 2 −16 −18 −6 −12	[22,3,2−]
	9_{43}	9n3	4 8 10 14 2 −16 6 −18 −12	[211,3,2−]
	9_{44}	9n1	4 8 10 −14 2 −16 −6 −18 −12	[22,21,2−]
	9_{45}	9n2	4 8 10 −14 2 16 −6 18 12	[211,21,2−]
	9_{46}	9n5	4 10 −14 −12 −16 2 −6 −18 −8	[3,3,21−]
	9_{47}	9n7	6 8 10 16 14 −18 4 2 −12	[8*-20]
	9_{48}	9n6	4 10 −14 −12 16 2 −6 18 8	[21,21,21−]
	9_{49}	9n8	6 -10 −14 12 −16 −2 18 −4 −8	[−20:−20:−20]

=== Ten crossings ===
Picture	Alexander– Briggs– Rolfsen	Dowker– Thistlethwaite	Dowker notation	Conway notation
	10_{1}	10a75	4 12 20 18 16 14 2 10 8 6	[82]
	10_{2}	10a59	4 12 14 16 18 20 2 6 8 10	[712]
	10_{3}	10a117	6 14 12 20 18 16 4 2 10 8	[64]
	10_{4}	10a113	6 12 14 20 18 16 4 2 10 8	[613]
	10_{5}	10a56	4 12 14 16 18 2 20 6 8 10	[6112]
	10_{6}	10a70	4 12 16 18 20 14 2 10 6 8	[532]
	10_{7}	10a65	4 12 14 18 16 20 2 10 8 6	[5212]
	10_{8}	10a114	6 14 12 16 18 20 4 2 8 10	[514]
	10_{9}	10a110	6 12 14 16 18 20 4 2 8 10	[5113]
	10_{10}	10a64	4 12 14 18 16 2 20 10 8 6	[51112]
	10_{11}	10a116	6 14 12 18 20 16 4 2 10 8	[433]
	10_{12}	10a43	4 10 14 16 2 20 18 6 8 12	[4312]
	10_{13}	10a54	4 10 18 16 12 2 20 8 6 14	[4222]
	10_{14}	10a33	4 10 12 16 18 2 20 6 8 14	[42112]
	10_{15}	10a68	4 12 16 18 14 2 10 20 6 8	[4132]
	10_{16}	10a115	6 14 12 16 18 20 4 2 10 8	[4123]
	10_{17}	10a107	6 12 14 16 18 2 4 20 8 10	[4114]
	10_{18}	10a63	4 12 14 18 16 2 10 20 8 6	[41122]
	10_{19}	10a108	6 12 14 16 18 2 4 20 10 8	[41113]
	10_{20}	10a74	4 12 18 20 16 14 2 10 8 6	[352]
	10_{21}	10a60	4 12 14 16 18 20 2 6 10 8	[3412]
	10_{22}	10a112	6 12 14 18 20 16 4 2 10 8	[3313]
	10_{23}	10a57	4 12 14 16 18 2 20 6 10 8	[33112]
	10_{24}	10a71	4 12 16 18 20 14 2 10 8 6	[3232]
	10_{25}	10a61	4 12 14 16 18 20 2 10 8 6	[32212]
	10_{26}	10a111	6 12 14 16 18 20 4 2 10 8	[32113]
	10_{27}	10a58	4 12 14 16 18 2 20 10 8 6	[321112]
	10_{28}	10a44	4 10 14 16 2 20 18 8 6 12	[31312]
	10_{29}	10a53	4 10 16 18 12 2 20 8 6 14	[31222]
	10_{30}	10a34	4 10 12 16 18 2 20 8 6 14	[312112]
	10_{31}	10a69	4 12 16 18 14 2 10 20 8 6	[31132]
	10_{32}	10a55	4 12 14 16 18 2 10 20 8 6	[311122]
	10_{33}	10a109	6 12 14 16 18 4 2 20 10 8	[311113]
	10_{34}	10a19	4 8 14 2 20 18 16 6 12 10	[2512]
	10_{35}	10a23	4 8 16 10 2 20 18 6 14 12	[2422]
	10_{36}	10a5	4 8 10 16 2 20 18 6 14 12	[24112]
	10_{37}	10a49	4 10 16 12 2 8 20 18 6 14	[2332]
	10_{38}	10a29	4 10 12 16 2 8 20 18 6 14	[23122]
	10_{39}	10a26	4 10 12 14 18 2 6 20 8 16	[22312]
	10_{40}	10a30	4 10 12 16 2 20 6 18 8 14	[222112]
	10_{41}	10a35	4 10 12 16 20 2 8 18 6 14	[221212]
	10_{42}	10a31	4 10 12 16 2 20 8 18 6 14	[2211112]
	10_{43}	10a52	4 10 16 14 2 20 8 18 6 12	[212212]
	10_{44}	10a32	4 10 12 16 14 2 20 18 8 6	[2121112]
	10_{45}	10a25	4 10 12 14 16 2 20 18 8 6	[21111112]
	10_{46}	10a81	6 8 14 2 16 18 20 4 10 12	[5,3,2]
	10_{47}	10a15	4 8 14 2 16 18 20 6 10 12	[5,21,2]
	10_{48}	10a79	6 8 14 2 16 18 4 20 10 12	[41,3,2]
	10_{49}	10a13	4 8 14 2 16 18 6 20 10 12	[41,21,2]
	10_{50}	10a82	6 8 14 2 16 18 20 4 12 10	[32,3,2]
	10_{51}	10a16	4 8 14 2 16 18 20 6 12 10	[32,21,2]
	10_{52}	10a80	6 8 14 2 16 18 4 20 12 10	[311,3,2]
	10_{53}	10a14	4 8 14 2 16 18 6 20 12 10	[311,21,2]
	10_{54}	10a48	4 10 16 12 2 8 18 20 6 14	[23,3,2]
	10_{55}	10a9	4 8 12 2 16 6 20 18 10 14	[23,21,2]
	10_{56}	10a28	4 10 12 16 2 8 18 20 6 14	[221,3,2]
	10_{57}	10a6	4 8 12 2 14 18 6 20 10 16	[221,21,2]
	10_{58}	10a20	4 8 14 10 2 18 6 20 12 16	[22,22,2]
	10_{59}	10a2	4 8 10 14 2 18 6 20 12 16	[22,211,2]
	10_{60}	10a1	4 8 10 14 2 16 18 6 20 12	[211,211,2]
	10_{61}	10a123	8 10 16 14 2 18 20 6 4 12	[4,3,3]
	10_{62}	10a41	4 10 14 16 2 18 20 6 8 12	[4,3,21]
	10_{63}	10a51	4 10 16 14 2 18 8 6 20 12	[4,21,21]
	10_{64}	10a122	8 10 14 16 2 18 20 6 4 12	[31,3,3]
	10_{65}	10a42	4 10 14 16 2 18 20 8 6 12	[31,3,21]
	10_{66}	10a40	4 10 14 16 2 18 8 6 20 12	[31,21,21]
	10_{67}	10a37	4 10 14 12 18 2 6 20 8 16	[22,3,21]
	10_{68}	10a67	4 12 16 14 18 2 20 6 10 8	[211,3,3]
	10_{69}	10a38	4 10 14 12 18 2 16 6 20 8	[211,21,21]
	10_{70}	10a22	4 8 16 10 2 18 20 6 14 12	[22,3,2+]
	10_{71}	10a10	4 8 12 2 18 14 6 20 10 16	[22,21,2+]
	10_{72}	10a4	4 8 10 16 2 18 20 6 14 12	[211,3,2+]
	10_{73}	10a3	4 8 10 14 2 18 16 6 20 12	[211,21,2+]
	10_{74}	10a62	4 12 14 16 20 18 2 8 6 10	[3,3,21+]
	10_{75}	10a27	4 10 12 14 18 2 16 6 20 8	[21,21,21+]
	10_{76}	10a73	4 12 18 20 14 16 2 10 8 6	[3,3,2++]
	10_{77}	10a18	4 8 14 2 18 20 16 6 12 10	[3,21,2++]
	10_{78}	10a17	4 8 14 2 18 16 6 12 20 10	[21,21,2++]
	10_{79}	10a78	6 8 12 2 16 4 18 20 10 14	[(3,2)(3,2)]
	10_{80}	10a8	4 8 12 2 16 6 18 20 10 14	[(3,2)(21,2)]
	10_{81}	10a7	4 8 12 2 16 6 18 10 20 14	[(21,2)(21,2)]
	10_{82}	10a83	6 8 14 16 4 18 20 2 10 12	[.4.2]
	10_{83}	10a84	6 8 16 14 4 18 20 2 12 10	[.31.20]
	10_{84}	10a50	4 10 16 14 2 8 18 20 12 6	[.22.2]
	10_{85}	10a86	6 8 16 14 4 18 20 2 10 12	[.4.20]
	10_{86}	10a87	6 8 14 16 4 18 20 2 12 10	[.31.2]
	10_{87}	10a39	4 10 14 16 2 8 18 20 12 6	[.22.20]
	10_{88}	10a11	4 8 12 14 2 16 20 18 10 6	[.21.21]
	10_{89}	10a21	4 8 14 12 2 16 20 18 10 6	[.21.210]
	10_{90}	10a92	6 10 14 2 16 20 18 8 4 12	[.3.2.2]
	10_{91}	10a106	6 10 20 14 16 18 4 8 2 12	[.3.2.20]
	10_{92}	10a46	4 10 14 18 2 16 8 20 12 6	[.21.2.20]
	10_{93}	10a101	6 10 16 20 14 4 18 2 12 8	[.3.20.2]
	10_{94}	10a91	6 10 14 2 16 18 20 8 4 12	[.30.2.2]
	10_{95}	10a47	4 10 14 18 2 16 20 8 12 6	[.210.2.2]
	10_{96}	10a24	4 8 18 12 2 16 20 6 10 14	[.2.21.2]
	10_{97}	10a12	4 8 12 18 2 16 20 6 10 14	[.2.210.2]
	10_{98}	10a96	6 10 14 18 2 16 20 4 8 12	[.2.2.2.20]
	10_{99}	10a103	6 10 18 14 2 16 20 8 4 12	[.2.2.20.20]
	10_{100}	10a104	6 10 18 14 16 4 20 8 2 12	[3:2:2]
	10_{101}	10a45	4 10 14 18 2 16 6 20 8 12	[21:2:2]
	10_{102}	10a97	6 10 14 18 16 4 20 2 8 12	[3:2:20]
	10_{103}	10a105	6 10 18 16 14 4 20 8 2 12	[30:2:2]
	10_{104}	10a118	6 16 12 14 18 4 20 2 8 10	[3:20:20]
	10_{105}	10a72	4 12 16 20 18 2 8 6 10 14	[21:20:20]
	10_{106}	10a95	6 10 14 16 18 4 20 2 8 12	[30:2:20]
	10_{107}	10a66	4 12 16 14 18 2 8 20 10 6	[210:2:20]
	10_{108}	10a119	6 16 12 14 18 4 20 2 10 8	[30:20:20]
	10_{109}	10a93	6 10 14 16 2 18 4 20 8 12	[2.2.2.2]
	10_{110}	10a100	6 10 16 20 14 2 18 4 8 12	[2.2.2.20]
	10_{111}	10a98	6 10 16 14 2 18 8 20 4 12	[2.2.20.2]
	10_{112}	10a76	6 8 10 14 16 18 20 2 4 12	[8*3]
	10_{113}	10a36	4 10 14 12 2 16 18 20 8 6	[8*21]
	10_{114}	10a77	6 8 10 14 16 20 18 2 4 12	[8*30]
	10_{115}	10a94	6 10 14 16 4 18 2 20 12 8	[8*20.20]
	10_{116}	10a120	6 16 18 14 2 4 20 8 10 12	[8*2:2]
	10_{117}	10a99	6 10 16 14 18 4 20 2 12 8	[8*2:20]
	10_{118}	10a88	6 8 18 14 16 4 20 2 10 12	[8*2:.2]
	10_{119}	10a85	6 8 14 18 16 4 20 10 2 12	[8*2:.20]
	10_{120}	10a102	6 10 18 12 4 16 20 8 2 14	[8*20::20]
	10_{121}	10a90	6 10 12 20 18 16 8 2 4 14	[9*20]
	10_{122}	10a89	6 10 12 14 18 16 20 2 4 8	[9*.20]
	10_{123}	10a121	8 10 12 14 16 18 20 2 4 6	[10*]
	10_{124}	10n21	4 8 -14 2 -16 -18 -20 -6 -10 -12	[5,3,2-]
	10_{125}	10n15	4 8 14 2 -16 -18 6 -20 -10 -12	[5,21,2-]
	10_{126}	10n17	4 8 -14 2 -16 -18 -6 -20 -10 -12	[41,3,2-]
	10_{127}	10n16	4 8 -14 2 16 18 -6 20 10 12	[41,21,2-]
	10_{128}	10n22	4 8 -14 2 -16 -18 -20 -6 -12 -10	[32,3,2-]
	10_{129}	10n18	4 8 14 2 -16 -18 6 -20 -12 -10	[32,21,-2]
	10_{130}	10n20	4 8 -14 2 -16 -18 -6 -20 -12 -10	[311,3,2-]
	10_{131}	10n19	4 8 -14 2 16 18 -6 20 12 10	[311,21,2-]
	10_{132}	10n13	4 8 -12 2 -16 -6 -20 -18 -10 -14	[23,3,2-]
	10_{133}	10n4	4 8 12 2 -14 -18 6 -20 -10 -16	[23,21,2-]
	10_{134}	10n6	4 8 -12 2 -14 -18 -6 -20 -10 -16	[221,3,2-]
	10_{135}	10n5	4 8 -12 2 14 18 -6 20 10 16	[221,21,2-]
	10_{136}	10n3	4 8 10 -14 2 -18 -6 -20 -12 -16	[22,22,2-]
	10_{137}	10n2	4 8 10 -14 2 -16 -18 -6 -20 -12	[22,211,2-]
	10_{138}	10n1	4 8 10 -14 2 16 18 -6 20 12	[211,211,2-]
	10_{139}	10n27	4 10 -14 -16 2 -18 -20 -6 -8 -12	[4,3,3-]
	10_{140}	10n29	4 10 -14 -16 2 18 20 -8 -6 12	[4,3,21-]
	10_{141}	10n25	4 10 -14 -16 2 18 -8 -6 20 12	[4,21,21-]
	10_{142}	10n30	4 10 -14 -16 2 -18 -20 -8 -6 -12	[31,3,3-]
	10_{143}	10n26	4 10 -14 -16 2 -18 -8 -6 -20 -12	[31,3,21-]
	10_{144}	10n28	4 10 14 16 2 -18 -20 8 6 -12	[31,21,21-]
	10_{145}	10n14	4 8 -12 -18 2 -16 -20 -6 -10 -14	[22,3,3-]
	10_{146}	10n23	4 8 -18 -12 2 -16 -20 -6 -10 -14	[22,21,21-]
	10_{147}	10n24	4 10 -14 12 2 16 18 -20 8 -6	[211,3,21-]
	10_{148}	10n12	4 8 -12 2 -16 -6 -18 -20 -10 -14	[(3,2)(3,2-)]
	10_{149}	10n11	4 8 -12 2 16 -6 18 20 10 14	[(3,2)(21,2-)]
	10_{150}	10n9	4 8 -12 2 -16 -6 -18 -10 -20 -14	[(21,2)(3,2-)]
	10_{151}	10n8	4 8 -12 2 16 -6 18 10 20 14	[(21,2)(21,2-)]
	10_{152}	10n36	6 8 12 2 -16 4 -18 -20 -10 -14	[(3,2)-(3,2)]
	10_{153}	10n10	4 8 12 2 -16 6 -18 -20 -10 -14	[(3,2)-(21,2)]
	10_{154}	10n7	4 8 12 2 -16 6 -18 -10 -20 -14	[(21,2)-(21,2)]
	10_{155}	10n39	6 10 14 16 18 4 -20 2 8 -12	[-3:2:2]
	10_{156}	10n32	4 12 16 -14 18 2 -8 20 10 6	[-3:2:20]
	10_{157}	10n42	6 -10 -18 14 -2 -16 20 8 -4 12	[-3:20:20]
	10_{158}	10n41	6 -10 -16 14 -2 -18 8 20 -4 -12	[-30:2:2]
	10_{159}	10n34	6 8 10 14 16 -18 -20 2 4 -12	[-30:2:20]
	10_{160}	10n33	4 12 -16 -14 -18 2 -8 -20 -10 -6	[-30:20:20]
	10_{161} (Note: Originally listed as both 10_{161} and 10_{162} in the Rolfsen table. The error was discovered by Kenneth Perko (see Perko pair).)	10n31	4 12 -16 14 -18 2 8 -20 -10 -6	[3:-20:-20]
	10_{162} (Note: Listed as 10_{163} in the Rolfsen table.)	10n40	6 10 14 18 16 4 -20 2 8 -12	[-30:-20:-20]
	10_{163} (Note: Listed as 10_{164} in the Rolfsen table.)	10n35	6 8 10 14 16 -20 -18 2 4 -12	[8*-30]
	10_{164} (Note: Listed as 10_{165} in the Rolfsen table.)	10n38	6 -10 -12 14 -18 -16 20 -2 -4 -8	[8*2:-20]
	10_{165} (Note: Listed as 10_{166} in the Rolfsen table.)	10n37	6 8 14 18 16 4 -20 10 2 -12	[8*2:.-20]

=== Higher ===
Kinoshita–Terasaka & Conway knots

- Conway knot 11n34
- Kinoshita–Terasaka knot 11n42

== Table of prime links ==
=== Eight or fewer crossings ===
Name	Picture	Alexander– Briggs– Rolfsen	Dowker– Thistlethwaite	Dowker notation	Conway notation
Unlink		0^{2}_{1}	—	—	—
Hopf link		2^{2}_{1}	L2a1	—	[2]
Solomon's knot		4^{2}_{1}	L4a1	—	[4]
Whitehead link		5^{2}_{1}	L5a1	—	[212]
L6a1		6^{2}_{3}	L6a1	—	—
L6a2		6^{2}_{2}	L6a2	—	—
L6a3		6^{2}_{1}	L6a3	—	—
Borromean rings		6^{3}_{2}	L6a4	—	[.1]
L6a5		6^{3}_{1}	L6a5	—	—
L6n1		6^{3}_{3}	L6n1	—	—
L7a1		7^{2}_{6}	L7a1	—	—
L7a2		7^{2}_{5}	L7a2	—	—
L7a3		7^{2}_{4}	L7a3	—	—
L7a4		7^{2}_{3}	L7a4	—	—
L7a5		7^{2}_{2}	L7a5	—	—
L7a6		7^{2}_{1}	L7a6	—	—
L7a7		7^{3}_{1}	L7a7	—	—
L7n1		7^{2}_{7}	L7n1	—	—
L7n2		7^{2}_{8}	L7n2	(6,-8|-10,12,-14,2,-4)	—

=== Higher ===
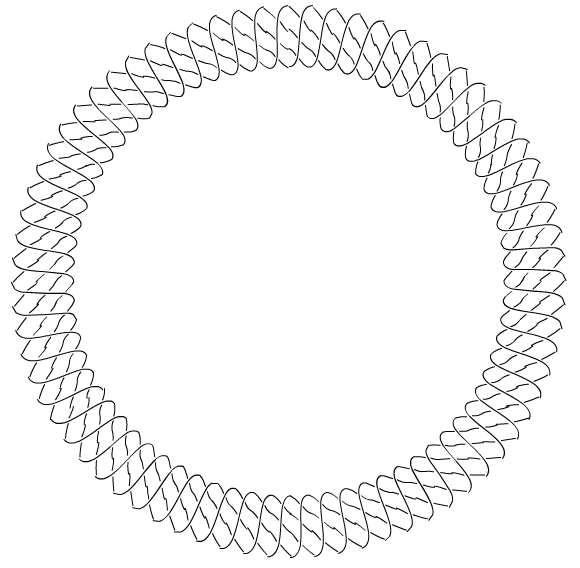
(36,3)-torus link

Picture	Alexander– Briggs– Rolfsen	Dowker– Thistlethwaite	Dowker notation	Conway notation
	8^{2}_{1}	L8a14	—	—
	—	L10a140	—	[.3:30]

== See also ==
- List of knots
- List of mathematical knots and links
- Knot tabulation
- (−2,3,7) pretzel knot
