= Link group =

Analog of the knot group

In knot theory, an area of mathematics, the link group of a link is an analog of the knot group of a knot. They were described by John Milnor in his Ph.D. thesis, (Milnor 1954). Notably, the link group is not in general the fundamental group of the link complement.

== Definition ==
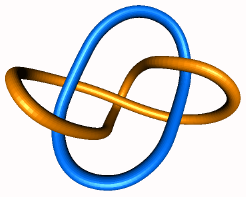
The Whitehead link is link homotopic to the unlink, but not isotopic to the unlink.

The link group of an n-component link is essentially the set of (n + 1)-component links extending this link, up to link homotopy. In other words, each component of the extended link is allowed to move through regular homotopy (homotopy through immersions), knotting or unknotting itself, but is not allowed to move through other components. This is a weaker condition than isotopy: for example, the Whitehead link has linking number 0, and thus is link homotopic to the unlink, but it is not isotopic to the unlink.

The link group is not the fundamental group of the link complement, since the components of the link are allowed to move through themselves, though not each other, but thus is a quotient group of the link complement's fundamental group, since one can start with elements of the fundamental group, and then by knotting or unknotting components, some of these elements may become equivalent to each other.

== Examples ==
The link group of the n-component unlink is the free group on n generators, $F_n$, as the link group of a single link is the knot group of the unknot, which is the integers, and the link group of an unlinked union is the free product of the link groups of the components.

The link group of the Hopf link is $\mathbf{Z}^2.$

The link group of the Hopf link, the simplest non-trivial link – two circles, linked once – is the free abelian group on two generators, $\mathbf{Z}^2.$ Note that the link group of two unlinked circles is the free nonabelian group on two generators, of which the free abelian group on two generators is a quotient. In this case the link group is the fundamental group of the link complement, as the link complement deformation retracts onto a torus.

The Whitehead link is link homotopic to the unlink – though it is not isotopic to the unlink – and thus has link group the free group on two generators.

== Milnor invariants ==
Milnor defined invariants of a link (functions on the link group) in (Milnor 1954), using the character $\bar{\mu},$ which have thus come to be called "Milnor's μ-bar invariants", or simply the "Milnor invariants". For each k, there is a k-ary function $\bar{\mu},$ which defines invariants according to which k of the links one selects, in which order.

Milnor's invariants can be related to Massey products on the link complement (the complement of the link); this was suggested in (Stallings 1965), and made precise in (Turaev 1976) and (Porter 1980).

As with Massey products, the Milnor invariants of length k + 1 are defined if all Milnor invariants of length less than or equal to k vanish. The first (2-fold) Milnor invariant is simply the linking number (just as the 2-fold Massey product is the cup product, which is dual to intersection), while the 3-fold Milnor invariant measures whether 3 pairwise unlinked circles are Borromean rings, and if so, in some sense, how many times (that is to say, the Borromean rings have a Milnor 3-fold invariant of 1 or –1, depending on order, but other 3-element links can have an invariant of 2 or more, just as linking numbers can be greater than 1).

Another definition is the following: consider a link $L=L_1\cup L_2\cup L_3$. Suppose that ${\rm lk}(L_i,L_j)=0$ for $i,j=1,2,3$ and $i<j$. Pick any Seifert surfaces for the respective link components, say, $F_1,F_2,F_3$, such that $F_i\cap L_j=\empty$ for all $i\ne j$. Then the Milnor 3-fold invariant equals minus the number of intersection points in $F_1\cap F_2\cap F_3$ counting with signs; (Cochran 1990).

Milnor invariants can also be defined if the lower order invariants do not vanish, but then there is an indeterminacy, which depends on the values of the lower order invariants. This indeterminacy can be understood geometrically as the indeterminacy in expressing a link as a closed string link, as discussed below (it can also be seen algebraically as the indeterminacy of Massey products if lower order Massey products do not vanish).

Milnor invariants can be considered as invariants of string links, in which case they are universally defined, and the indeterminacy of the Milnor invariant of a link is precisely due to the multiple ways that a given links can be cut into a string link; this allows the classification of links up to link homotopy, as in (Habegger & Lin 1990). Viewed from this point of view, Milnor invariants are finite type invariants, and in fact they (and their products) are the only rational finite type concordance invariants of string links; (Habegger & Masbaum 2000).

The number of linearly independent Milnor invariants of length $k+1$ for m-component links is $m N_k - N_{k+1}$, where $N_k$ is the number of basic commutators of length k in the free Lie algebra on m generators, namely:

$$N_k = \frac{1}{k}\sum_{d|m}\phi(d)\left(m^{k/d}\right)$$,

where $\phi$ is the Möbius function; see for instance (Orr 1989). This number grows on the order of $m^{k+1}/k^2$.

== Applications ==
Link groups can be used to classify Brunnian links.

== See also ==
- Knot group
- Regular homotopy
