= Solomon's knot =

Motif with two doubly-interlinked loops

Basic Solomon's knot
- Braid length: 7
- Braid no.: 4
- Crossing no.: 4
- Hyperbolic volume: 0
- Linking no.: 2
- Stick no.: 5
- Unknotting no.: 2
- Conway notation: [4]
- Thistlethwaite: L4a1
- Last / Next: L2a1 / L5a1

Other
- alternating

Solomon's knot (Latin: sigillum Salomonis, lit. 'Solomon's seal') is a traditional decorative motif used since ancient times, and found in many cultures. Despite the name, it is classified as a link, and is not a true knot according to the definitions of mathematical knot theory.

== Structure ==
Decorative Solomon's knot

The Solomon's knot consists of two closed loops, which are doubly interlinked in an interlaced manner. If laid flat, the Solomon's knot is seen to have four crossings where the two loops interweave under and over each other. This contrasts with two crossings in the simpler Hopf link.

In most artistic representations, the parts of the loops that alternately cross over and under each other become the sides of a central square, while four loopings extend outward in four directions. The four extending loopings may have oval, square, or triangular endings, or may terminate with free-form shapes such as leaves, lobes, blades, wings etc.

== Occurrences ==
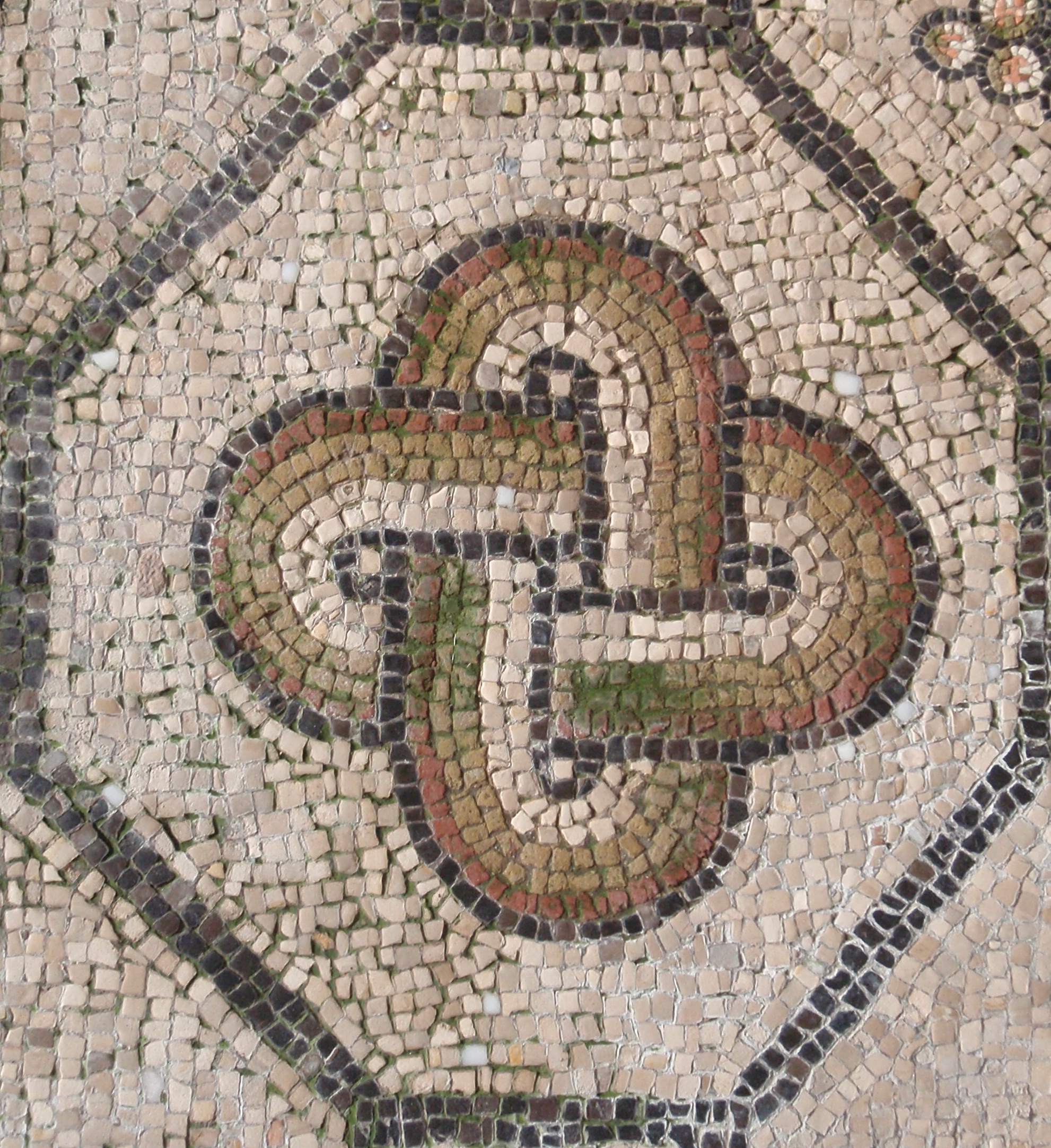
Ancient Roman mosaic in Aquileia (Italy)

The Solomon's knot often occurs in ancient Roman mosaics, usually represented as two interlaced ovals.

Sepphoris National Park, Israel, has Solomon's Knots in stone mosaics at the site of an ancient synagogue.

In Africa, Solomon's knot is found on glass beadwork, textiles, and carvings of the Yoruba people. When the knot appears in this culture, it often denotes royal status; thus, it is featured on crowns, tunics, and other ceremonial objects.

Across the Middle East, historical Islamic sites show Solomon's knot as part of Muslim tradition. It appears over the doorway of an early twentieth century CE mosque/madrasa in Cairo. Two versions of Solomon's knot are included in the recently excavated Yattir Mosaic in Jordan. To the east, it is woven into an antique Central Asian prayer rug. To the west, Solomon's knot appeared in Moorish Spain, and it shines in leaded glass windows in a late twentieth century CE mosque in the United States. The British Museum, London, England has a fourteenth-century CE Egyptian Qur'an with a Solomon's Knot as its frontispiece.

University of California, Los Angeles Fowler Museum of Cultural History has a large African collection that includes nineteenth and twentieth century CE Yoruba glass beadwork crowns and masks decorated with Solomon's Knots.

Home of Peace Mausoleum, a Jewish Cemetery, Los Angeles, has multiple images of Solomon's knot in stone and concrete bas reliefs sculpted 1934 CE.

Saint Sophia's Greek Orthodox Cathedral, "Byzantine District" of Los Angeles has an olive wood Epitaphios (bier for Christ) with Solomon's knots carved at each corner. The Epitaphios is used in the Greek Easter services.

Powell Library University of California, Los Angeles has ceiling beams in the Main Reading Room covered with Solomon's Knots. Built in 1926 CE, the reading room also features a central Dome of Wisdom bordered by Solomon's knots.

== Name ==
In Latin, this configuration was sometimes known as sigillum Salomonis, meaning literally 'seal of Solomon'. It was associated with the Biblical monarch Solomon because of his reputation for wisdom and knowledge (and in some legends, his occult powers). This phrase is usually rendered into English as "Solomon's knot", since "seal of Solomon" has other conflicting meanings (often referring to either a Star of David or pentagram). In the study of ancient mosaics, the Solomon's knot is often known as a "guilloche knot" or "duplex knot", while a Solomon's knot in the center of a decorative configuration of four curving arcs is known as a "pelta-swastika" (where pelta is Latin for "shield").

Among other names currently in use are the following:

- "Foundation Knot" applies to the interweaving or interlacing which is the basis for many elaborate Celtic designs, and is used in the United States in crochet and macramé patterns.
- "Imbolo" describes the knot design on the textiles of the Kuba people of Congo.
- Nodo di Salomone is the Italian term for Solomon's knot, and is used to name the Solomon's knot mosaic found at the ruins of a synagogue at Ostia, the ancient seaport for Rome.

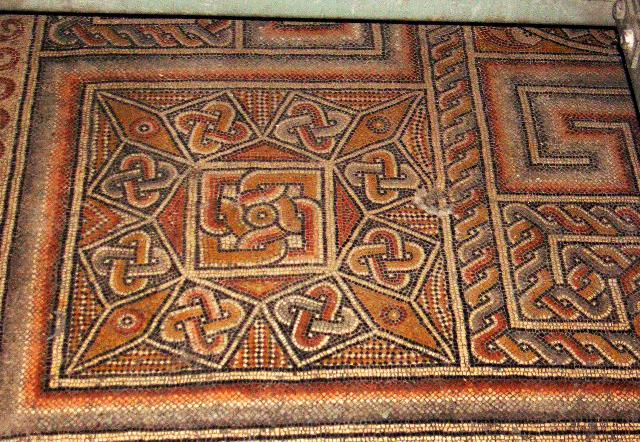
Multiple Solomon's knots in a mosaic in the Church of the Nativity (Bethlehem)

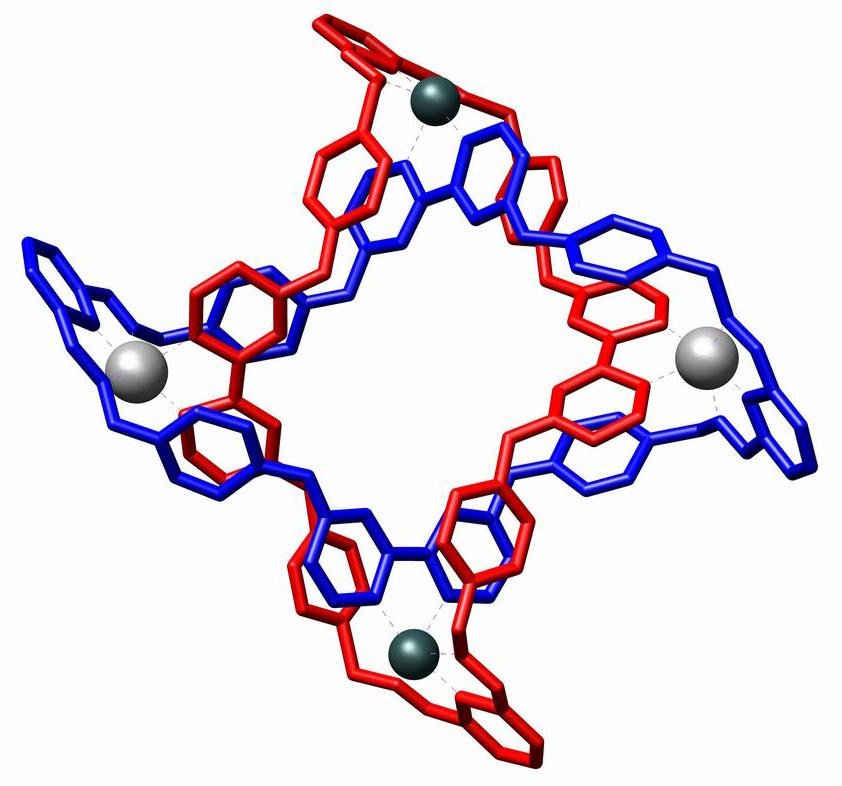
Molecular Solomon's knot

Quadruple Solomon's knot

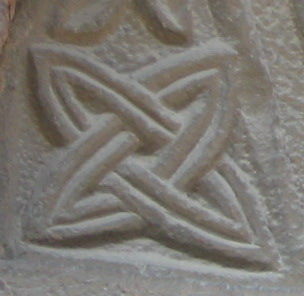
Solomon's knot carving in Almenno San Bartolomeo (Italy)

== See also ==
- Quatrefoil
- Swastika
- Whitehead link
- Comacine masters
