= 7 2 knot =

Mathematical knot with crossing number 7

Pentatwist knot, five-twist knot
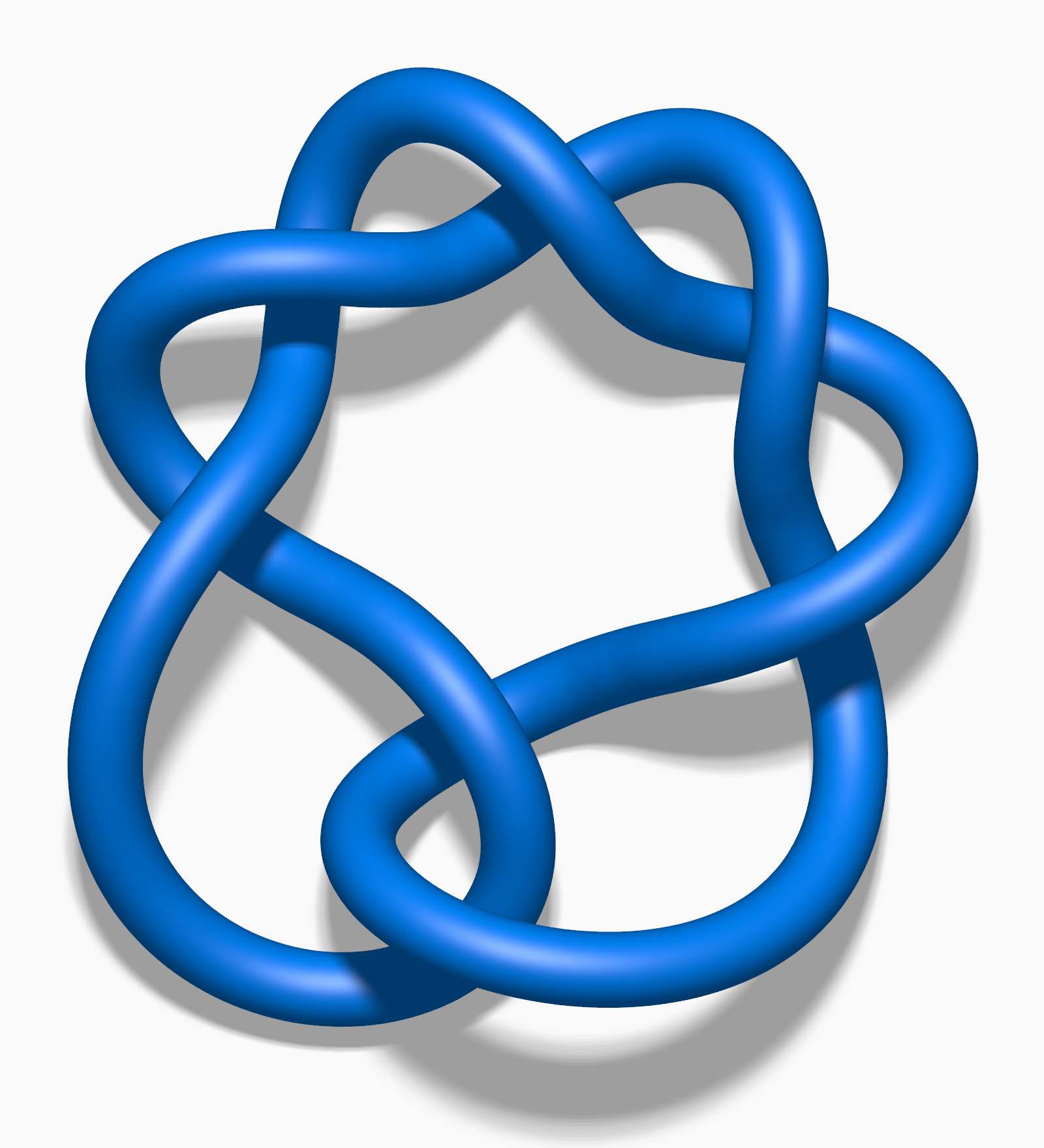
- Arf invariant: 1
- Braid length: 9
- Braid no.: 4
- Bridge no.: 2
- Crosscap no.: 2
- Crossing no.: 7
- Genus: 1
- Hyperbolic volume: 2.82812
- Stick no.: 9
- Unknotting no.: 1
- Conway notation: [52]
- A–B notation: 7_{2}
- Dowker notation: 4, 8, 12, 14, 2, 6, 10
- Last / Next: 7_{1} / 7_{3}

Other
- alternating, prime, reversible

In knot theory, the Pentatwist knot, also known as the five-twist knot, or the 7_{2}, is one of seven prime knots with crossing number seven. It is the fifth twist knot.

== Invariants ==
Its Alexander polynomial is

$$\Delta(t) = 3t - 5 + 3t^{-1}, \,$$

its Conway polynomial is

$$\nabla(z) = 3z^{2}+1, \,$$

and its Jones polynomial is

$V(q) = -q^{-8} + q^{-7} - q^{-6} + 2q^{-5} - 2q^{-4} + 2q^{-3} - q^{-2} + q^{-1}. \,$

== Example ==
Assembling of 7_{2} knot.
