= 62 knot =

Mathematical knot with crossing number 6

6_{2} knot
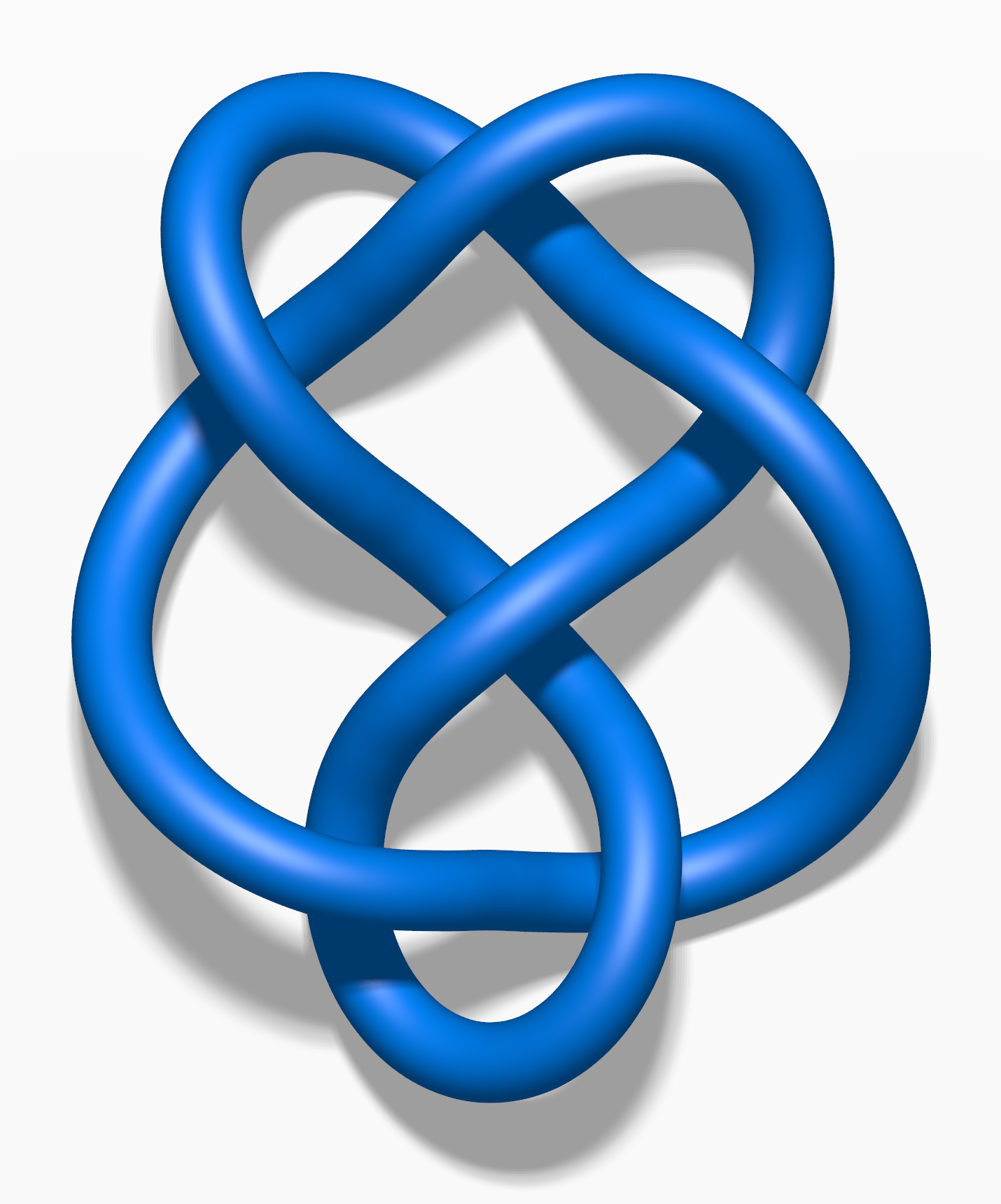
- Arf invariant: 1
- Braid length: 6
- Braid no.: 3
- Bridge no.: 2
- Crosscap no.: 2
- Crossing no.: 6
- Genus: 2
- Hyperbolic volume: 4.40083
- Stick no.: 8
- Unknotting no.: 1
- Conway notation: [312]
- A–B notation: 6_{2}
- Dowker notation: 4, 8, 10, 12, 2, 6
- Last / Next: 6_{1} / 6_{3}

Other
- alternating, hyperbolic, fibered, prime, reversible

In knot theory, the 6_{2} knot is one of three prime knots with crossing number six, the others being the stevedore knot and the 6_{3} knot. This knot is sometimes referred to as the Miller Institute knot, because it appears in the logo of the Miller Institute for Basic Research in Science at the University of California, Berkeley.

The 6_{2} knot can be represented with the following parametric equation:

$$\begin{align}
x &=  \cos(2\phi) \\
y &=  \cos(7\phi + \pi/4) \\
z &=  \cos(\phi + 1.9065) + \cos(7\phi + 5.01637)
\end{align}$$

with $0\leq\phi\leq 2\pi$.

The 6_{2} knot is invertible but not amphichiral. Its Alexander polynomial is

$$\Delta(t) = -t^2 + 3t -3 + 3t^{-1} - t^{-2}, \,$$

its Conway polynomial is

$$\nabla(z) = -z^4 - z^2 + 1, \,$$

and its Jones polynomial is

$V(q) = q - 1 + 2q^{-1} - 2q^{-2} + 2q^{-3} - 2q^{-4} + q^{-5}. \,$

The 6_{2} knot is a hyperbolic knot, with its complement having a volume of approximately 4.40083.

== Surface ==
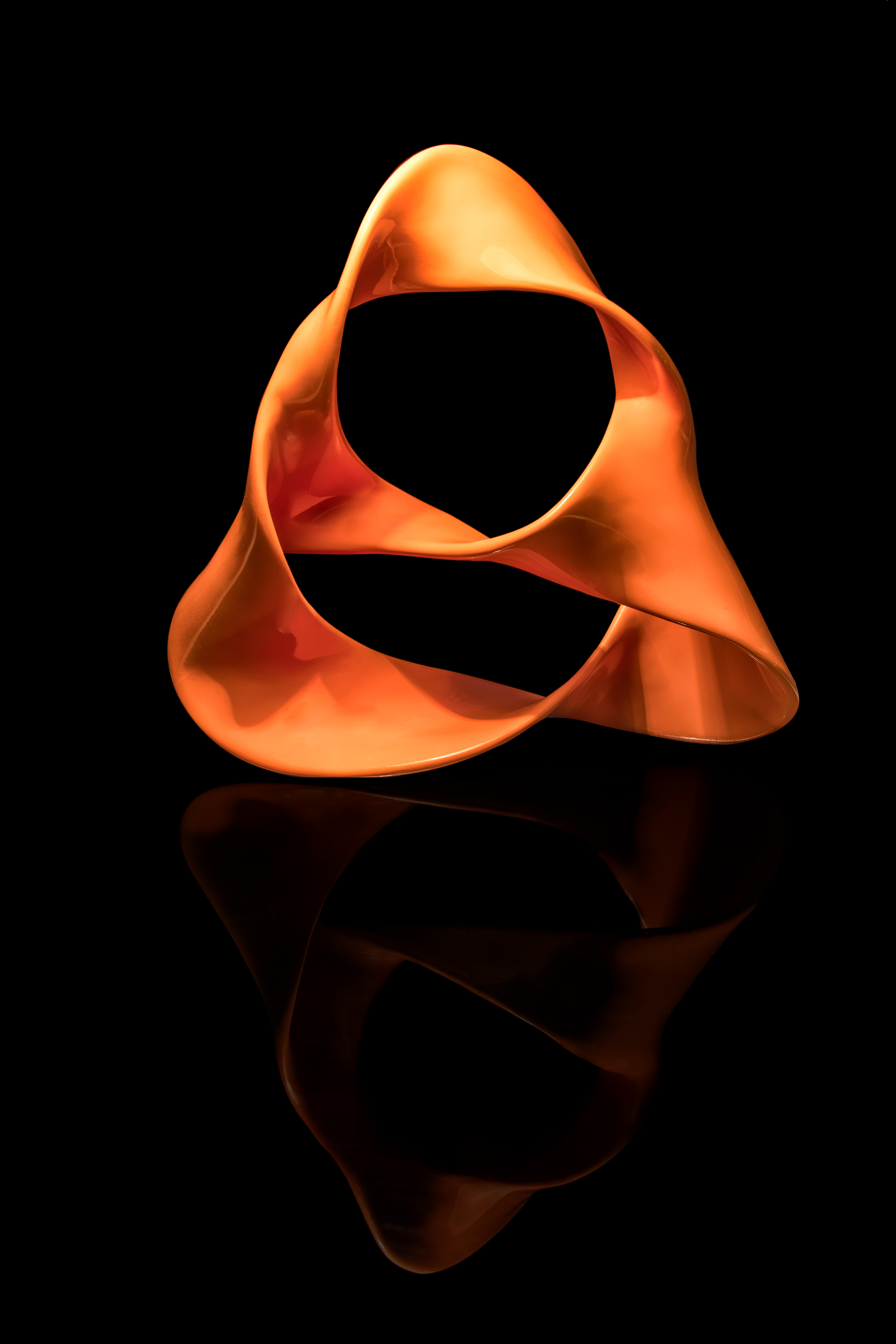
Surface of knot 6.2

== Example ==
Ways to assemble of knot 6.2

Example 1

Example 2

If a bowline is tied and the two free ends of the rope are brought together in the simplest way, the knot obtained is the 6_{2} knot. The sequence of necessary moves are depicted here:

From a bowline (ends connected) to the 6₂ knot
