= List of mathematical knots and links =

A table of all prime knots with seven crossings or fewer (not including mirror images).

This article contains a list of mathematical knots and links. See also list of knots, list of geometric topology topics.

== Knots ==
=== Prime knots ===
- 0_{1} knot/Unknot - a simple un-knotted closed loop
- 3_{1} knot/Trefoil knot - (2,3)-torus knot, the two loose ends of a common overhand knot joined together
- 4_{1} knot/Figure-eight knot (mathematics) - a prime knot with a crossing number four
- 5_{1} knot/Cinquefoil knot, (5,2)-torus knot, Solomon's seal knot, pentafoil knot - a prime knot with crossing number five which can be arranged as a {5/2} star polygon (pentagram)
- 5_{2} knot/Three-twist knot - the twist knot with three-half twists
- 6_{1} knot/Stevedore knot (mathematics) - a prime knot with crossing number six, it can also be described as a twist knot with four twists
- 6_{2} knot - a prime knot with crossing number six
- 6_{3} knot - a prime knot with crossing number six
- 7_{1} knot, septafoil knot, (7,2)-torus knot - a prime knot with crossing number seven, which can be arranged as a {7/2} star polygon (heptagram)
- 7_{4} knot, "endless knot"
- 8_{18} knot, "carrick mat"
- 10_{161}/10_{162}, known as the Perko pair; this was a single knot listed twice in Dale Rolfsen's knot table; the duplication was discovered by Kenneth Perko
- 12n242/(−2,3,7) pretzel knot
- (p, q)-torus knot - a special kind of knot that lies on the surface of an unknotted torus in R^{3}

=== Composite ===
- Square knot (mathematics) - a composite knot obtained by taking the connected sum of a trefoil knot with its reflection
- Granny knot (mathematics) - a composite knot obtained by taking the connected sum of two identical trefoil knots

== Links ==
- 0^{2}_{1} link/Unlink - equivalent under ambient isotopy to finitely many disjoint circles in the plane
- 2^{2}_{1} link/Hopf link - the simplest nontrivial link with more than one component; it consists of two circles linked together exactly once (L2a1)
- 4^{2}_{1} link/Solomon's knot (a two component "link" rather than a one component "knot") - a traditional decorative motif used since ancient times (L4a1)
- 5^{2}_{1} link/Whitehead link - two projections of the unknot: one circular loop and one figure eight-shaped loop intertwined such that they are inseparable and neither loses its form (L5a1)
- Brunnian link - a nontrivial link that becomes trivial if any component is removed
- 6^{3}_{2} link/Borromean rings - three topological circles which are linked and form a Brunnian link (L6a4)
- L10a140 link - presumably the simplest non-Borromean Brunnian link
- Pretzel link - a Montesinos link with integer tangles
