= Unicursal =

Unicursal may refer to:

- Eulerian path, a sequential set of edges within a graph that reach all nodes
- Labyrinth, a unicursal maze
- Unicursal curve, a curve which is birationally equivalent to a line
- Unicursal hexagram, a star polygon
