= Unlink =

Link that consists of finitely many unlinked unknots

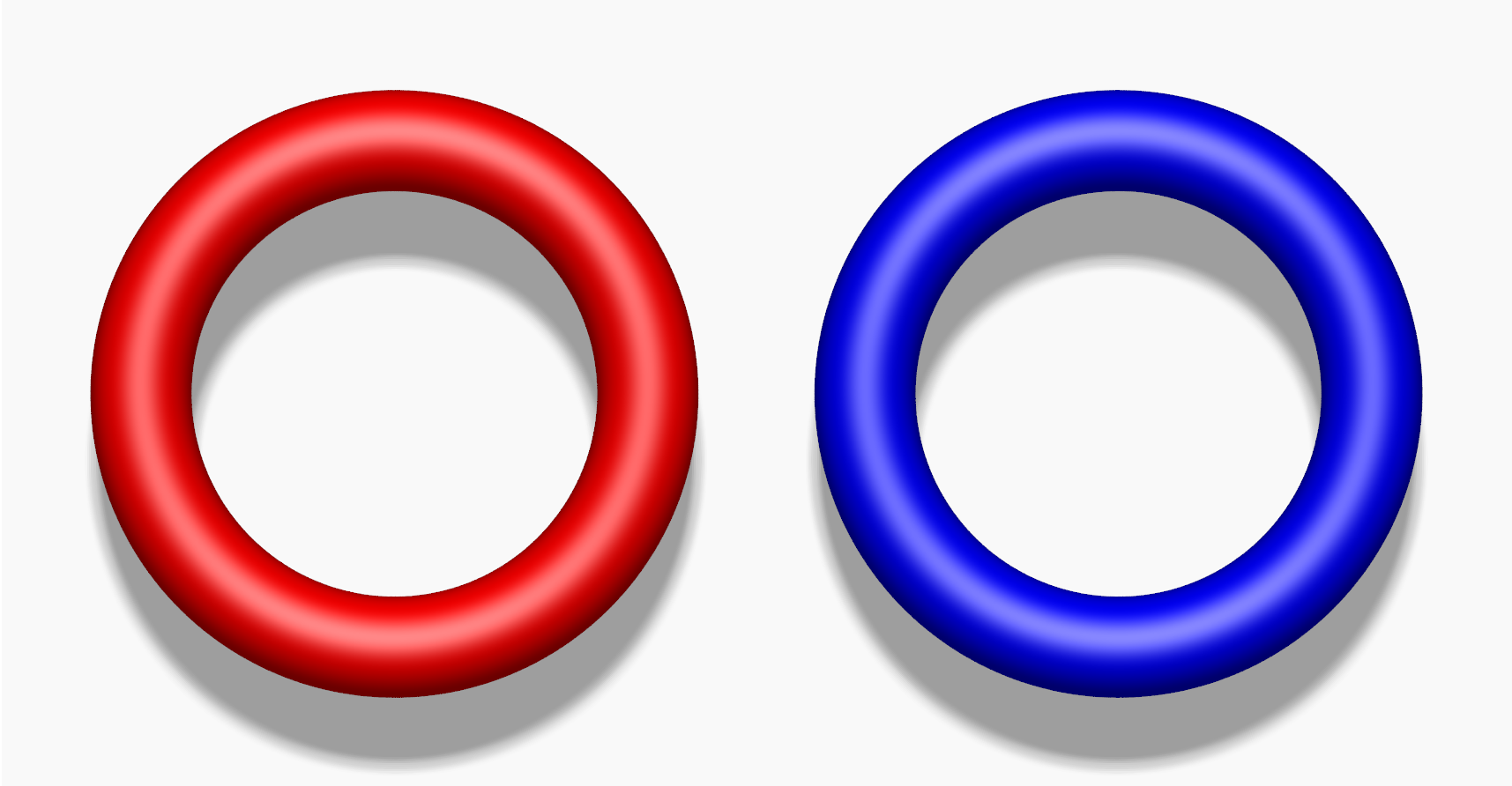
- 2-component unlink
- Common name: Circle
- Crossing no.: 0
- Linking no.: 0
- Stick no.: 6
- Unknotting no.: 0
- Conway notation: -
- A–B notation: 0^{2}_{1}
- Dowker notation: -
- Next: L2a1

Other
- , tricolorable (if n>1)

In the mathematical field of knot theory, an unlink is a link that is equivalent (under ambient isotopy) to finitely many disjoint circles in the plane.

The two-component unlink, consisting of two non-interlinked unknots, is the simplest possible unlink.

== Properties ==
- An n-component link L ⊂ S^{3} is an unlink if and only if there exists n disjointly embedded discs D_{i} ⊂ S^{3} such that L = ∪_{i}∂D_{i}.
- A link with one component is an unlink if and only if it is the unknot.
- The link group of an n-component unlink is the free group on n generators, and is used in classifying Brunnian links.

== Examples ==
- The Hopf link is a simple example of a link with two components that is not an unlink.
- The Borromean rings form a link with three components that is not an unlink; however, any two of the rings considered on their own do form a two-component unlink.
- Taizo Kanenobu has shown that for all n > 1 there exists a hyperbolic link of n components such that any proper sublink is an unlink (a Brunnian link). The Whitehead link and Borromean rings are such examples for n = 2, 3.

== See also ==
- Linking number
