= Brunnian link =

Interlinked multi-loop construction where cutting one loop frees all the others

This four-component link is a Brunnian link.

In knot theory, a branch of topology, a Brunnian link is a nontrivial link that becomes a set of trivial unlinked circles if any one component is removed. In other words, cutting any loop frees all the other loops (so that no two loops can be directly linked).

The name Brunnian is after Hermann Brunn. Brunn's 1892 article Über Verkettung included examples of such links.

== Examples ==
The Borromean rings are the simplest Brunnian link.

Six-component "rubberband" Brunnian link. The same construction leads to Brunnian links with arbitrary numbers of components.

The best-known and simplest possible Brunnian link is the Borromean rings, a link of three unknots. However for every number three or above, there are an infinite number of links with the Brunnian property containing that number of loops. Here are some relatively simple three-component Brunnian links which are not the same as the Borromean rings:

12-crossing link.

18-crossing link.

24-crossing link.

The simplest Brunnian link other than the 6-crossing Borromean rings is presumably the 10-crossing L10a140 link.

An example of an n-component Brunnian link is given by the "rubberband" Brunnian Links, where each component is looped around the next as aba^{−1}b^{−1}, with the last looping around the first, forming a circle.

In 2020, new and much more complicated Brunnian links were discovered in using highly flexible geometric-topology methods. See Section 6.

== Non-circularity ==
It is impossible for a Brunnian link to be constructed from geometric circles. Somewhat more generally, if a link has the property that each component is a circle and no two components are linked, then it is trivial. The proof, by Michael Freedman and Richard Skora, embeds the three-dimensional space containing the link as the boundary of a Poincaré ball model of four-dimensional hyperbolic space, and considers the hyperbolic convex hulls of the circles. These are two-dimensional subspaces of the hyperbolic space, and their intersection patterns reflect the pairwise linking of the circles: if two circles are linked, then their hulls have a point of intersection, but with the assumption that pairs of circles are unlinked, the hulls are disjoint. Taking cross-sections of the Poincaré ball by concentric three-dimensional spheres, the intersection of each sphere with the hulls of the circles is again a link made out of circles, and this family of cross-sections provides a continuous motion of all of the circles that shrinks each of them to a point without crossing any of the others.

== Classification ==
Brunnian links were classified up to link-homotopy by John Milnor in (Milnor 1954), and the invariants he introduced are now called Milnor invariants.

An (n + 1)-component Brunnian link can be thought of as an element of the link group – which in this case (but not in general) is the fundamental group of the link complement – of the n-component unlink, since by Brunnianness removing the last link unlinks the others. The link group of the n-component unlink is the free group on n generators, F_{n}, as the link group of a single link is the knot group of the unknot, which is the integers, and the link group of an unlinked union is the free product of the link groups of the components.

Not every element of the link group gives a Brunnian link, as removing any other component must also unlink the remaining n elements. Milnor showed that the group elements that do correspond to Brunnian links are related to the graded Lie algebra of the lower central series of the free group, which can be interpreted as "relations" in the free Lie algebra.

In 2021, two special satellite operations were investigated for Brunnian links in 3-sphere, called "satellite-sum" and "satellite-tie", both of which can be used to construct infinitely many distinct Brunnian links from almost every Brunnian link. A geometric classification theorem for Brunnian links was given. More interestingly, a canonical geometric decomposition in terms of satellite-sum and satellite-tie, which is simpler than JSJ-decomposition, for Brunnian links, was developed. The building blocks of Brunnian links therein turn out to be Hopf -links, hyperbolic Brunnian links, and hyperbolic Brunnian links in unlink-complements, the last of which can be further reduced into a Brunnian link in 3-sphere.

=== Massey products ===
Brunnian links can be understood in algebraic topology via Massey products: a Massey product is an n-fold product which is only defined if all (n − 1)-fold products of its terms vanish. This corresponds to the Brunnian property of all (n − 1)-component sublinks being unlinked, but the overall n-component link being non-trivially linked.

== Brunnian braids ==
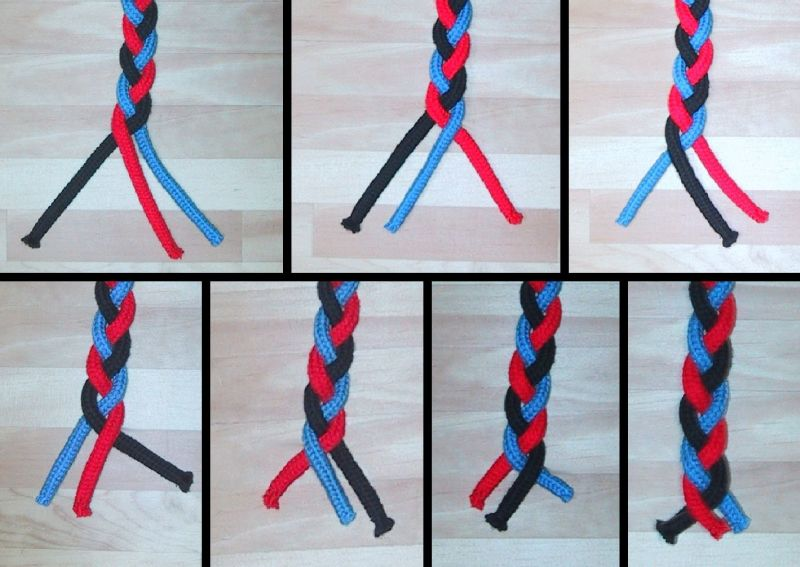
The standard braid is Brunnian: if one removes the black strand, the blue strand is always on top of the red strand, and they are thus not braided around each other; likewise for removing other strands.

A Brunnian braid is a braid that becomes trivial upon removal of any one of its strings. Brunnian braids form a subgroup of the braid group. Brunnian braids over the 2-sphere that are not Brunnian over the 2-disk give rise to non-trivial elements in the homotopy groups of the 2-sphere. For example, the "standard" braid corresponding to the Borromean rings gives rise to the Hopf fibration S^{3} → S^{2}, and iteration of this (as in everyday braiding) is likewise Brunnian.

== Real-world examples ==
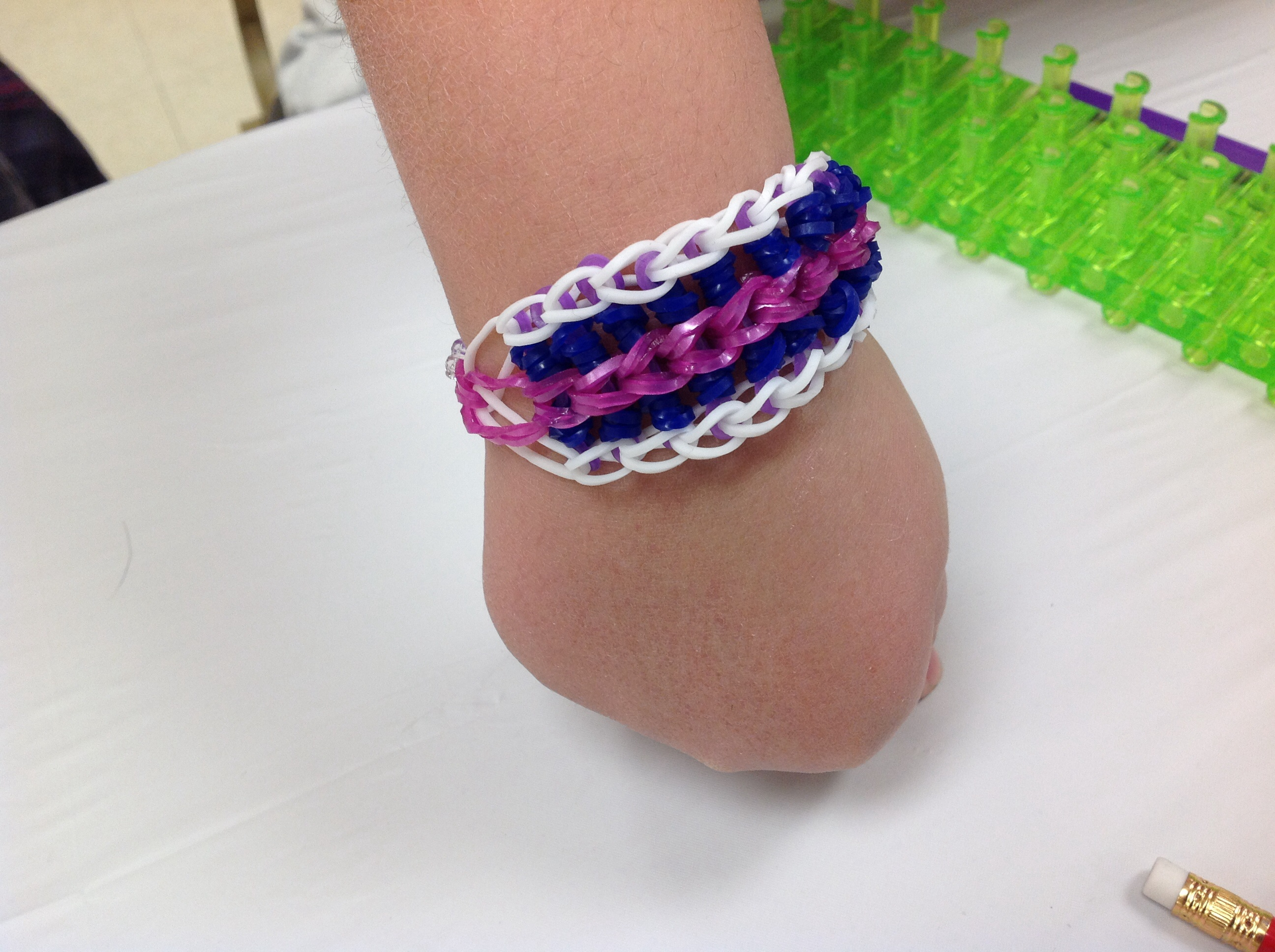
Rainbow loom bracelet showing Brunnian chains

Many disentanglement puzzles and some mechanical puzzles are variants of Brunnian links, with the goal being to free a single piece only partially linked to the rest, thus dismantling the structure.

Brunnian chains are also used to create wearable and decorative items out of elastic bands using devices such as the Rainbow Loom or Wonder Loom.
