= 63 knot =

Mathematical knot with crossing number 6

6_{3} knot
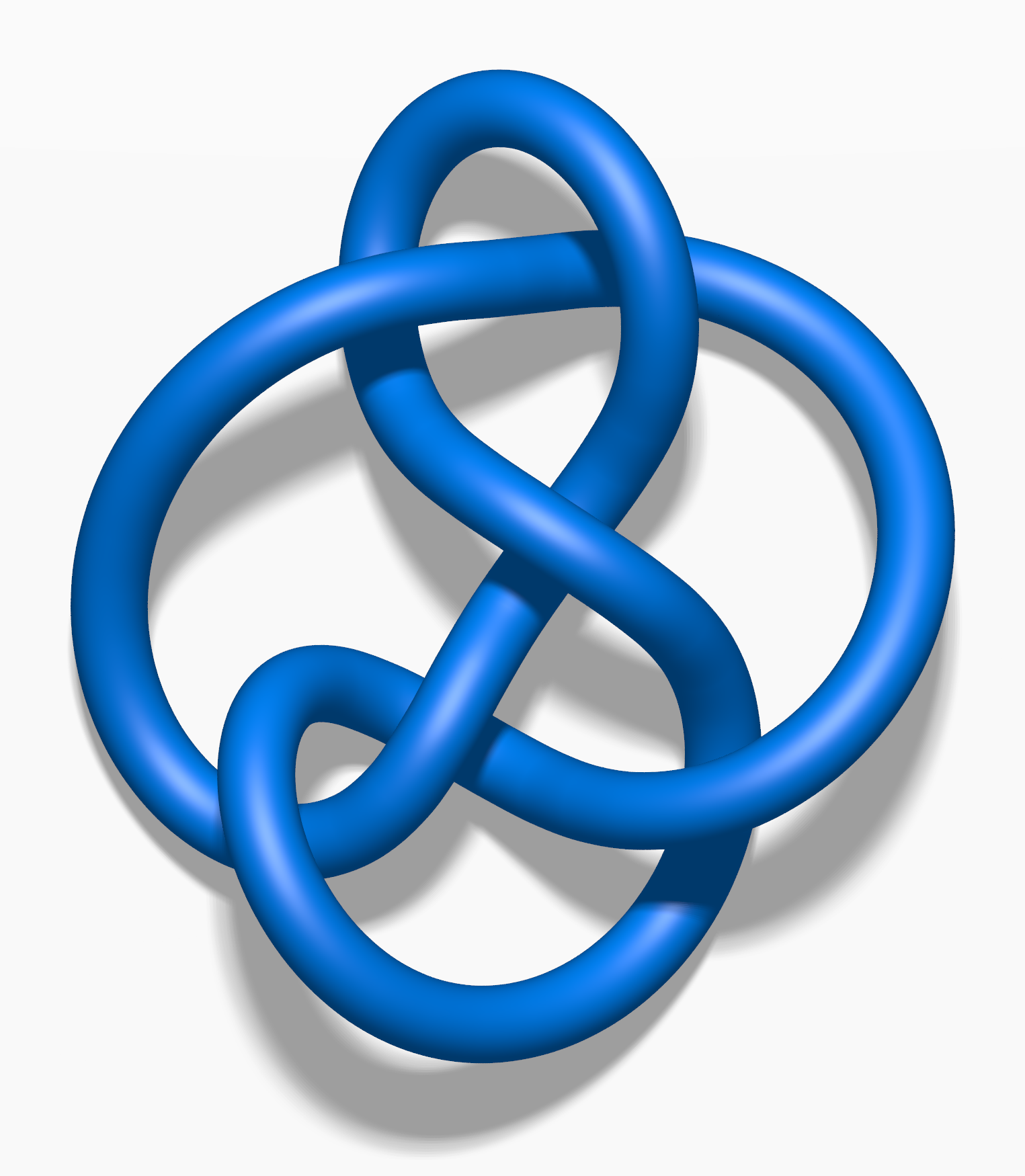
- Arf invariant: 1
- Braid length: 6
- Braid no.: 3
- Bridge no.: 2
- Crosscap no.: 3
- Crossing no.: 6
- Genus: 2
- Hyperbolic volume: 5.69302
- Stick no.: 8
- Unknotting no.: 1
- Conway notation: [2112]
- A–B notation: 6_{3}
- Dowker notation: 4, 8, 10, 2, 12, 6
- Last / Next: 6_{2} / 7_{1}

Other
- alternating, hyperbolic, fibered, prime, fully amphichiral

In knot theory, the 6_{3} knot is one of three prime knots with crossing number six, the others being the stevedore knot and the 6_{2} knot. It is alternating, hyperbolic, and fully amphichiral. It can be written as the braid word

$\sigma_1^{-1}\sigma_2^2\sigma_1^{-2}\sigma_2. \,$

6_{3} is a Lissajous knot and can be represented with the following parametric equation:

$$\begin{align}
x &=  \cos(2\phi) \\
y &=  \cos(3\phi + 0.67319) \\
z &=  \cos(11\phi + 0.89759)
\end{align}$$

with $0\leq\phi\leq 2\pi$.

== Symmetry ==
Like the figure-eight knot, the 6_{3} knot is fully amphichiral. This means that the 6_{3} knot is amphichiral, meaning that it is indistinguishable from its own mirror image. In addition, it is also invertible, meaning that orienting the curve in either direction yields the same oriented knot.

== Invariants ==
The Alexander polynomial of the 6_{3} knot is

$$\Delta(t) = t^2 - 3t + 5 - 3t^{-1} + t^{-2}, \,$$

Conway polynomial is

$$\nabla(z) = z^4 + z^2 + 1, \,$$

Jones polynomial is

$$V(q) = -q^3 + 2q^2 - 2q + 3 - 2q^{-1} + 2q^{-2} - q^{-3}, \,$$

and the Kauffman polynomial is

$L(a,z) = az^5 + z^5a^{-1} + 2a^2z^4 + 2z^4a^{-2} + 4z^4 + a^3z^3 + az^3 + z^3a^{-1} + z^3a^{-3} - 3a^2z^2 - 3z^2a^{-2} - 6z^2 - a^3z - 2az - 2za^{-1} - za^{}-3 + a^2 + a^{-2} +3. \,$

The 6_{3} knot is a hyperbolic knot, with its complement having a volume of approximately 5.69302.
