= Hopf link =

Simplest nontrivial knot link

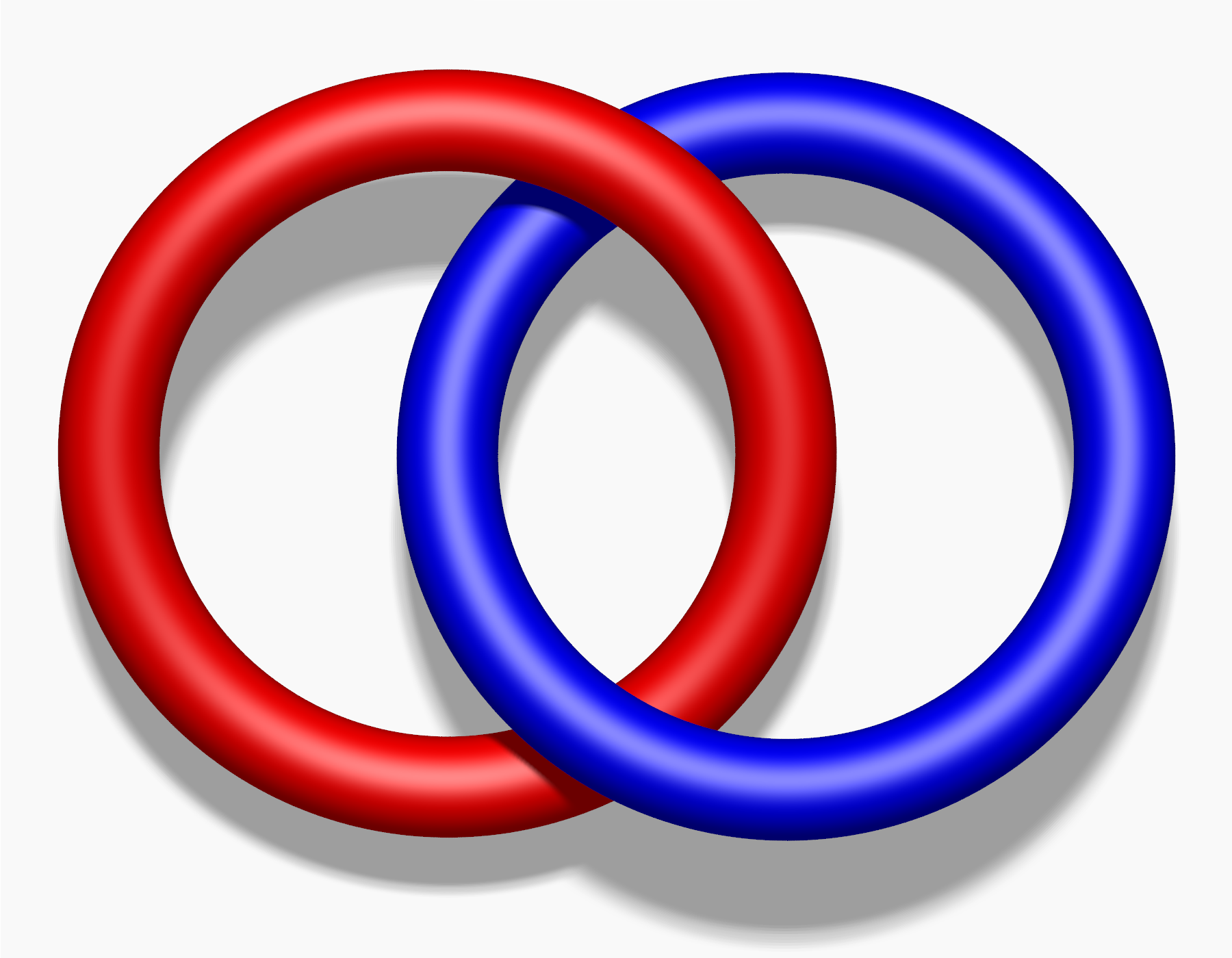
- Braid length: 2
- Braid no.: 2
- Crossing no.: 2
- Hyperbolic volume: 0
- Linking no.: 1
- Stick no.: 6
- Unknotting no.: 1
- Conway notation: [2]
- A–B notation: 2^{2}_{1}
- Thistlethwaite: L2a1
- Last / Next: L0 / L4a1

Other
- alternating, torus, fibered

Skein relation for the Hopf link.

In mathematical knot theory, the Hopf link is the simplest nontrivial link with more than one component. It consists of two circles linked together exactly once, and is named after Heinz Hopf.

== Geometric realization ==
A concrete model consists of two unit circles in perpendicular planes, each passing through the center of the other. This model minimizes the ropelength of the link and until 2002 the Hopf link was the only link whose ropelength was known. The convex hull of these two circles forms a shape called an oloid.

== Properties ==
Depending on the relative orientations of the two components the linking number of the Hopf link is ±1.

The Hopf link is a (2,2)-torus link with the braid word $\sigma_1^2$.

The knot complement of the Hopf link is R × S^{1} × S^{1}, the cylinder over a torus. This space has a locally Euclidean geometry, so the Hopf link is not a hyperbolic link. The knot group of the Hopf link (the fundamental group of its complement) is Z^{2} (the free abelian group on two generators), distinguishing it from an unlinked pair of loops which has the free group on two generators as its group.

The Hopf-link is not tricolorable: it is not possible to color the strands of its diagram with three colors, so that at least two of the colors are used and so that every crossing has one or three colors present. Each link has only one strand, and if both strands are given the same color then only one color is used, while if they are given different colors then the crossings will have two colors present.

== Hopf bundle ==
The Hopf fibration is a continuous function from the 3-sphere (a three-dimensional surface in four-dimensional Euclidean space) into the more familiar 2-sphere, with the property that the inverse image of each point on the 2-sphere is a circle. Thus, these images decompose the 3-sphere into a continuous family of circles, and each two distinct circles form a Hopf link. This was Hopf's motivation for studying the Hopf link: because each two fibers are linked, the Hopf fibration is a nontrivial fibration. This example began the study of homotopy groups of spheres.

== Biology ==
The Hopf link is also present in some proteins. It consists of two covalent loops, formed by pieces of protein backbone, closed with disulfide bonds. The Hopf link topology is highly conserved in proteins and adds to their stability.

== History ==
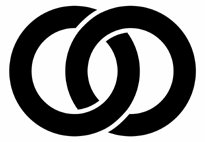
Buzan-ha crest

The Hopf link is named after topologist Heinz Hopf, who considered it in 1931 as part of his research on the Hopf fibration. However, in mathematics, it was known to Carl Friedrich Gauss before the work of Hopf. It has also long been used outside mathematics, for instance as the crest of Buzan-ha, a Japanese Buddhist sect founded in the 16th century.

== See also ==
- Borromean rings, a link with three closed loops
- Catenane, a molecule with two linked loops
- Solomon's knot, two loops which are doubly linked
