= 74 knot =

Mathematical knot with crossing number 7

7_{4}
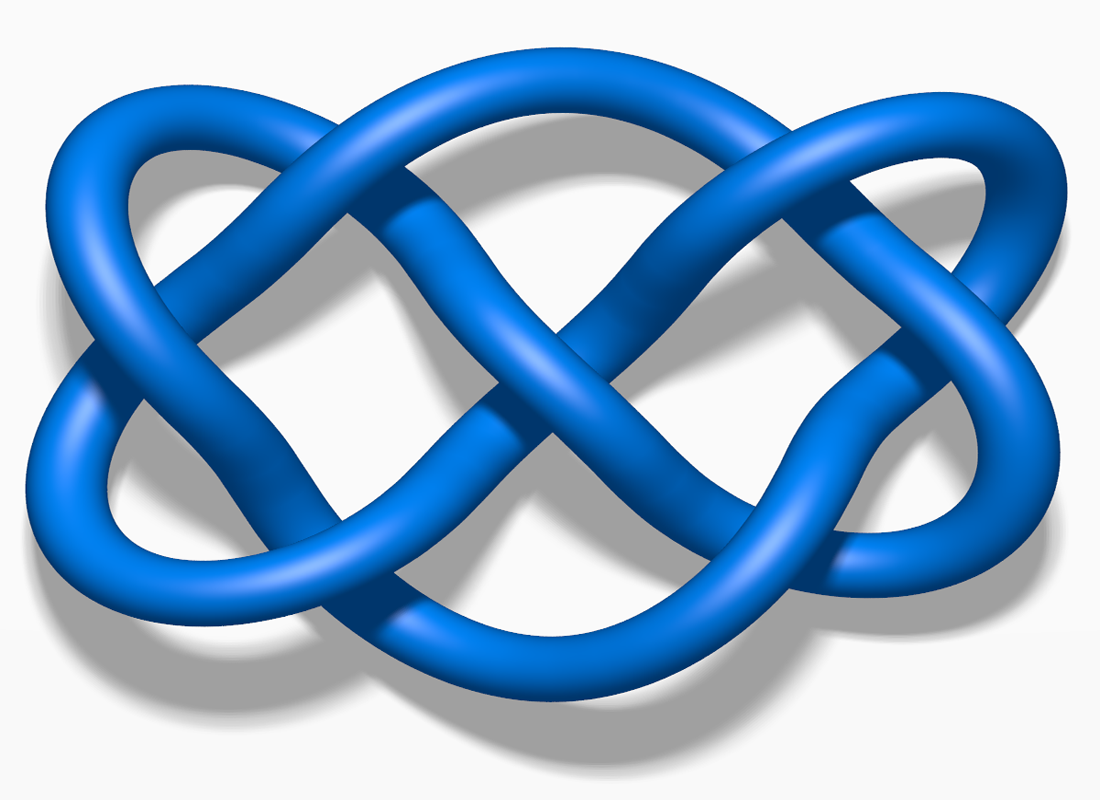
- Arf invariant: 0
- Braid length: 9
- Braid no.: 4
- Bridge no.: 2
- Crosscap no.: 3
- Crossing no.: 7
- Genus: 1
- Hyperbolic volume: 5.13794
- Stick no.: 9
- Unknotting no.: 2
- Conway notation: [313]
- A–B notation: 7_{4}
- Dowker notation: 6, 10, 12, 14, 4, 2, 8
- Last / Next: 7_{3} / 7_{5}

Other
- alternating, hyperbolic, prime, reversible, tricolorable

In mathematical knot theory, 7_{4} is the name of a 7-crossing knot which can be visually depicted in a highly-symmetric form, and so appears in the symbolism and/or artistic ornamentation of various cultures.

== Visual representations ==
The interlaced version of the simplest form of the Endless knot symbol of Buddhism is topologically equivalent to the 7_{4} knot (though it appears to have nine crossings), as is the interlaced version of the unicursal hexagram of occultism. (However, the endless knot symbol has more complex forms not equivalent to 7_{4}, and both the endless knot and unicursal hexagram can appear in non-interlaced versions, in which case they are not knots at all.)

The 7_{4} knot is a Lissajous knot, representable for example by the parametric equation

$$\begin{aligned}
x &= \cos (2t+0.22)\\
y &= \cos (3t+1.10)\\
z &= \cos 7t
\end{aligned}$$

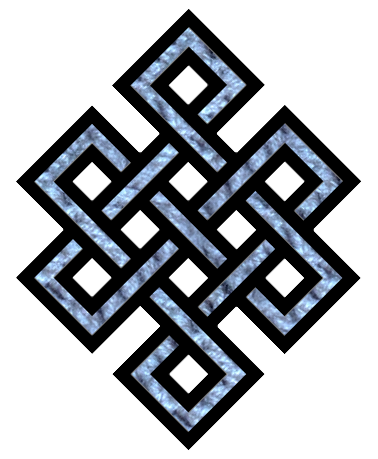
One form of the Endless knot of Buddhism

Interwoven unicursal hexagram.

7_{4} knot in Celtic artistic form, also found in some Hausa embroideries.

A 7_{4} knot combined with the Syrian flag is used as a logo by the National Coordination Committee for Democratic Change.

== Example ==
Assembling of 7_{4} knot.
