= Hermann Brunn =

German mathematician (1862–1939)

Karl Hermann Brunn
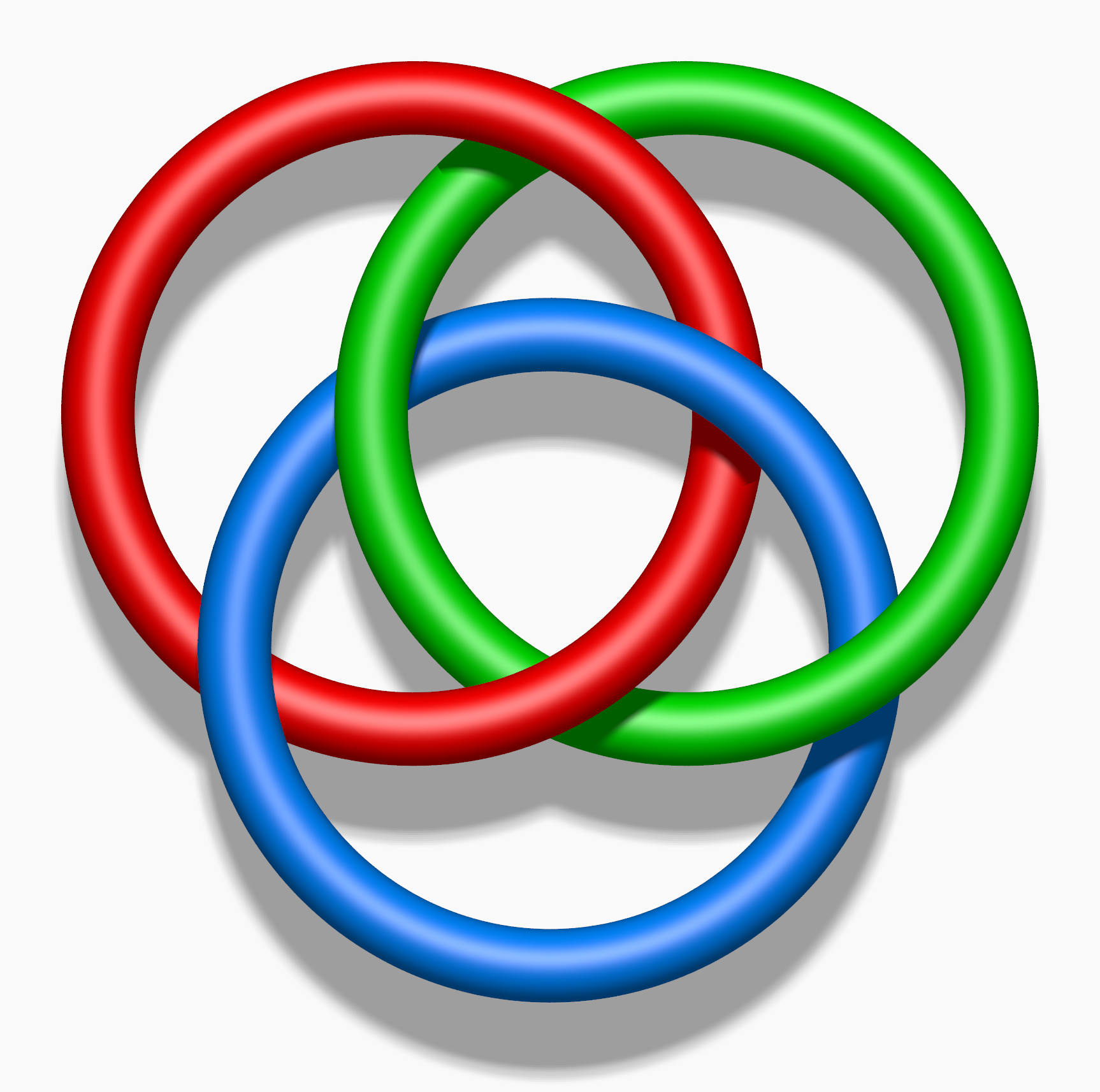
- The Borromean rings are the simplest Brunnian link.
- Born: 1 August 1862
- Died: 20 September 1939 (aged 77)
- Education: Ludwig-Maximilians-Universität München
- Known for: Convex geometry, knot theory
- Scientific career
- Thesis: Über Ovale und Eiflächen (1887)

More complex Brunnian link of six loops, based on illustration in Brunn's 1892 paper

Karl Hermann Brunn (1 August 1862 – 20 September 1939) was a German mathematician, known for his work in convex geometry (see Brunn–Minkowski inequality) and in knot theory. Brunnian links are named after him, as his 1892 article "Über Verkettung" included examples of such links.

== Life and work ==
Hermann Brunn was born in Rome, and grew up in Munich. He studied mathematics and physics at the Ludwig-Maximilians-Universität München, graduating in 1887 with the thesis Über Ovale und Eiflächen (About ovals and eggforms). He habilitated in 1889.
