= Whitehead link =

Two interlinked loops with five structural crossings

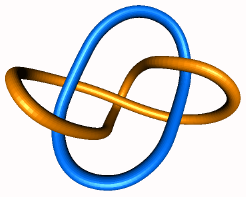
- Braid length: 5
- Braid no.: 3
- Crossing no.: 5
- Hyperbolic volume: 3.663862377
- Linking no.: 0
- Unknotting no.: 1
- Conway notation: [212]
- A–B notation: 5^{2}_{1}
- Thistlethwaite: L5a1
- Last / Next: L4a1 / L6a1

Other
- alternating

In knot theory, the Whitehead link, named for J. H. C. Whitehead, is one of the most basic links. It can be drawn as an alternating link with five crossings, from the overlay of a circle and a figure-eight shaped loop.

== Structure ==
Alternating link diagram

Alternative diagram, symmetric by 3d rotation around a vertical line in the plane of the drawing

A common way of describing this knot is formed by overlaying a figure-eight shaped loop with another circular loop surrounding the crossing of the figure-eight. The above-below relation between these two unknots is then set as an alternating link, with the consecutive crossings on each loop alternating between under and over. This drawing has five crossings, one of which is the self-crossing of the figure-eight curve, which does not count towards the linking number. Because the remaining crossings have equal numbers of under and over crossings on each loop, its linking number is 0. It is not isotopic to the unlink, but it is link homotopic to the unlink.

Although this construction of the knot treats its two loops differently from each other, the two loops are topologically symmetric: it is possible to deform the same link into a drawing of the same type in which the loop that was drawn as a figure eight is circular and vice versa. Alternatively, there exist realizations of this knot in three dimensions in which the two loops can be taken to each other by a geometric symmetry of the realization.

In braid theory notation, the link is written

$$\sigma^2_1\sigma^2_2\sigma^{-1}_1\sigma^{-2}_2.\,$$

Its Alexander polynomial is

$$\Delta (t)=t^{3/2}-3t^{1/2}+3t^{-1/2}-t^{-3/2},$$

since
$$\begin{pmatrix} 1 & 0 & 0 \\ -1 & 1 & 0 \\ 0 & 1 & -1\end{pmatrix}$$
is a possible Seifert matrix, or because of its Conway polynomial, which is

$$\nabla(z)=z^3 .$$

Its Jones polynomial is

$$V(t) = t^{-{3 \over 2}}\left(-1 + t - 2t^2 + t^3 - 2t^4 + t^5\right).$$

This polynomial and $V(1/t)$ are the two factors of the Jones polynomial of the L10a140 link. Notably, $V(1/t)$ is the Jones polynomial for the mirror image of a link having Jones polynomial $V(t)$.

== Volume ==
The hyperbolic volume of the complement of the Whitehead link is 4 times Catalan's constant, approximately 3.66. The Whitehead link complement is one of two two-cusped hyperbolic manifolds with the minimum possible volume, the other being the complement of the pretzel link with parameters (−2, 3, 8).

Dehn filling on one component of the Whitehead link can produce the sibling manifold of the complement of the figure-eight knot, and Dehn filling on both components can produce the Weeks manifold, respectively one of the minimum-volume hyperbolic manifolds with one cusp and the minimum-volume hyperbolic manifold with no cusps.

== History ==
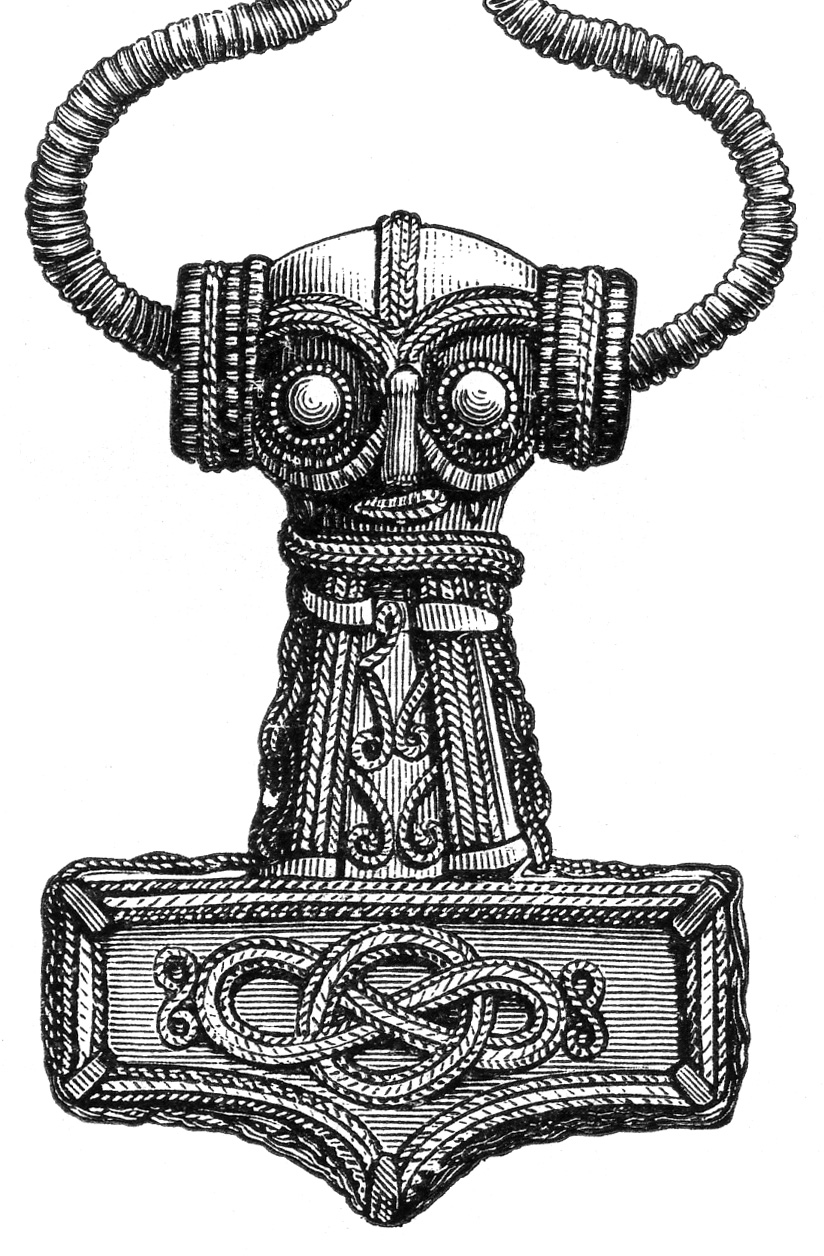
Old Thor's hammer archaeological artefact

The Whitehead link is named for J. H. C. Whitehead, who spent much of the 1930s looking for a proof of the Poincaré conjecture. In 1934, he used the link as part of his construction of the now-named Whitehead manifold, which refuted his previous purported proof of the conjecture.

== See also ==
- Solomon's knot
- Weeks manifold
- Whitehead double
