= Unicursal hexagram =

Six-pointed star polygon drawn with one line

Solid-stroke unicursal hexagram

Interlaced unicursal hexagram

The unicursal hexagram is a hexagram or six-pointed star that can be traced or drawn unicursally, in one continuous line rather than by two overlaid triangles. The hexagram can also be depicted inside a circle with the points touching it. It is often depicted in an interlaced form with the lines of the hexagram passing over and under one another to form a knot. It is a specific instance of the far more general shape discussed in Blaise Pascal's 1639 Hexagrammum Mysticum.

== Giordano Bruno ==
In his work titled Essays upon the Mathematics of Mordente: One Hundred and Sixty Articles against the Mathematicians and Philosophers of this Age (Prague: 1588), Italian philosopher, cosmological theorist, and Hermetic occultist Giordano Bruno used a symbol called Figura Amoris ("figure of love") part of the Hermetic trinity in his mathesis. This figure has a square outline; within it are the six lines of a unicursal hexagram. This hexagram however, does not connect the six corners of a hexagon, rather, it connects the four corners and two mid-edges of a square.

== Thelema ==
The hexagram-and-flower sigil of Thelema

In Aleister Crowley's Thelema, the hexagram is usually depicted with a five-petalled flower in the centre which symbolises the pentagram. The hexagram represents the heavenly macrocosmic or planetary forces and is a symbol equivalent to the Rosicrucian Rose Cross or ancient Egyptian ankh. The five petals of the flower represent the microcosmic forces of 5 elements of the magical formula YHShVH and is a symbol equivalent to the pentagram or pentacle. The two symbols together represent the interweaving of the planetary and elemental forces.

== See also ==
- 7_{4} knot
- Hexagram
