= Hyperbolic link =

Type of mathematical link

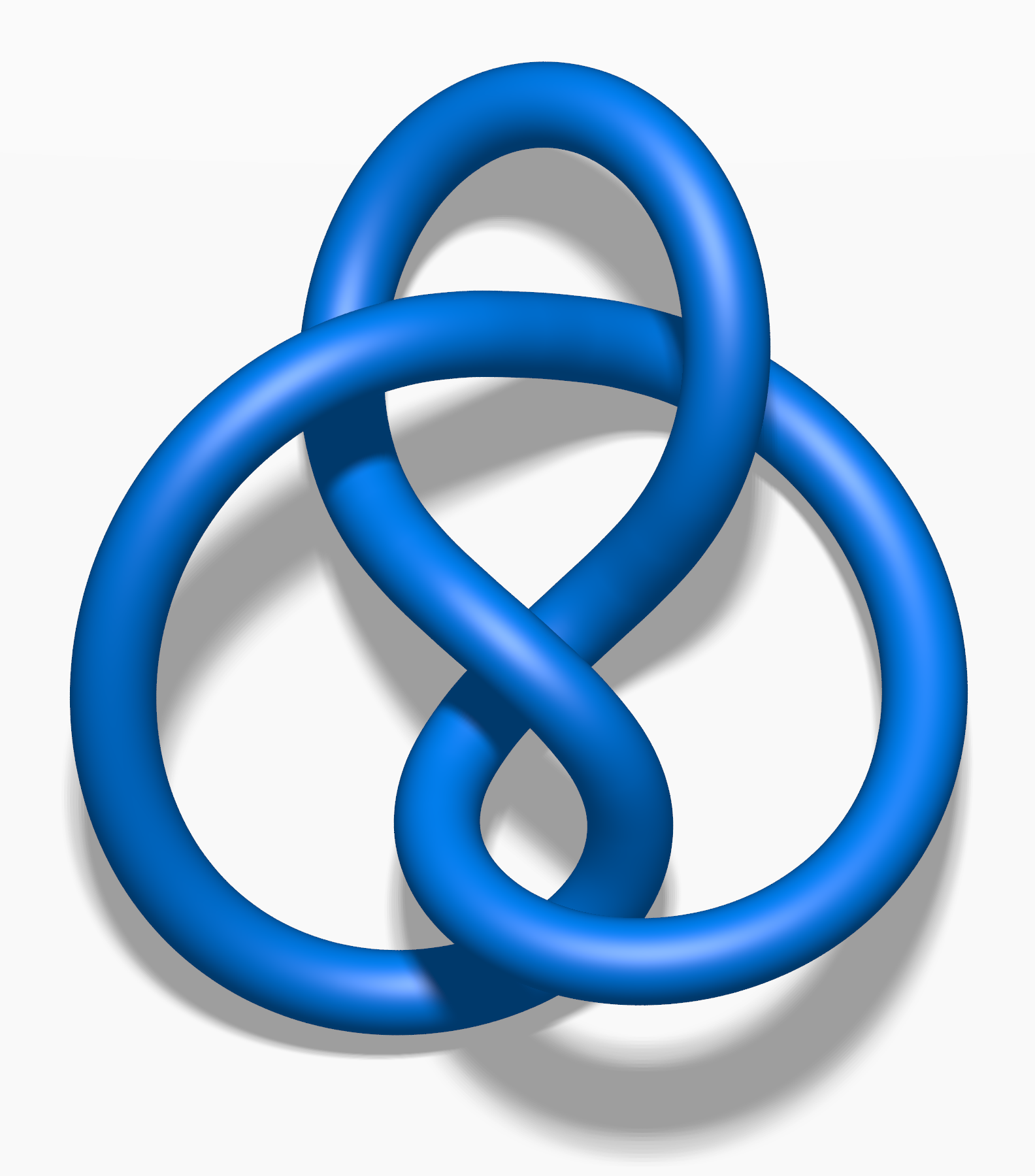
4_{1} knot

In mathematics, a hyperbolic link is a link in the 3-sphere with complement that has a complete Riemannian metric of constant negative curvature, i.e. has a hyperbolic geometry. A hyperbolic knot is a hyperbolic link with one component.

As a consequence of the work of William Thurston, it is known that every knot is precisely one of the following: hyperbolic, a torus knot, or a satellite knot. As a consequence, hyperbolic knots can be considered plentiful. A similar heuristic applies to hyperbolic links.

As a consequence of Thurston's hyperbolic Dehn surgery theorem, performing Dehn surgeries on a hyperbolic link enables one to obtain many more hyperbolic 3-manifolds.

== Examples ==
Borromean rings are a hyperbolic link.

- Borromean rings are hyperbolic.
- Every non-split, prime, alternating link that is not a torus link is hyperbolic by a result of William Menasco.
- 4_{1} knot (the figure-eight knot)
- 5_{2} knot (the three-twist knot)
- 6_{1} knot (the stevedore knot)
- 6_{2} knot
- 6_{3} knot
- 7_{4} knot
- 10 161 knot (the "Perko pair" knot)
- 12n242 knot

== See also ==
- SnapPea
- Hyperbolic volume (knot)
