= Hyperbolic volume =

Normalized hyperbolic volume of the complement of a hyperbolic knot

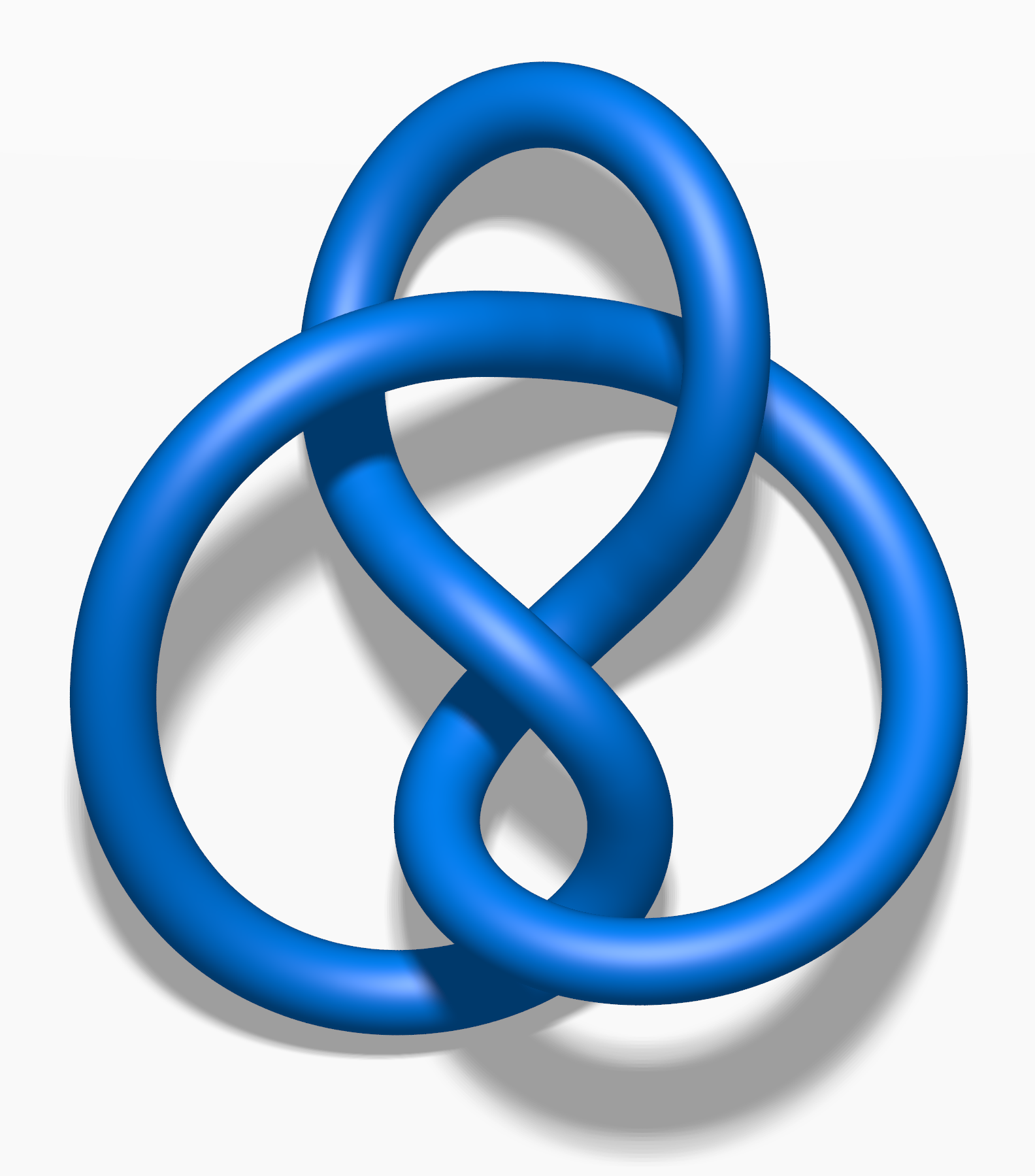
The hyperbolic volume of the figure-eight knot is 2.0298832.

In the mathematical field of knot theory, the hyperbolic volume of a hyperbolic link is the volume of the link's complement with respect to its complete hyperbolic metric. The volume is necessarily a finite real number, and is a topological invariant of the link. As a link invariant, it was first studied by William Thurston in connection with his geometrization conjecture.

== Knot and link invariant ==
A hyperbolic link is a link in the 3-sphere whose complement (the space formed by removing the link from the 3-sphere) can be given a complete Riemannian metric of constant negative curvature, giving it the structure of a hyperbolic 3-manifold, a quotient of hyperbolic space by a group acting freely and discontinuously on it. The components of the link will become cusps of the 3-manifold, and the manifold itself will have finite volume. By Mostow rigidity, when a link complement has a hyperbolic structure, this structure is uniquely determined, and any geometric invariants of the structure are also topological invariants of the link. In particular, the hyperbolic volume of the complement is a knot invariant. In order to make it well-defined for all knots or links, the hyperbolic volume of a non-hyperbolic knot or link is often defined to be zero.

There are only finitely many hyperbolic knots for any given volume. A mutation of a hyperbolic knot will have the same volume, so it is possible to concoct examples with equal volumes; indeed, there are arbitrarily large finite sets of distinct knots with equal volumes. In practice, hyperbolic volume has proven very effective in distinguishing knots, utilized in some of the extensive efforts at knot tabulation. Jeffrey Weeks's computer program SnapPea is the ubiquitous tool used to compute hyperbolic volume of a link.

Knot/link	Volume	Reference
Figure-eight knot	$\textstyle -6 \int_0^{\pi/3}{\log{|2\sin\theta|} d\theta} = 2.02988...$	
Three-twist knot	2.82812	
Stevedore knot	3.16396	
6_{2} knot	4.40083	
Endless knot	5.13794	
Perko pair	5.63877	
6_{3} knot	5.69302	
Borromean rings	$\textstyle -16 \int_0^{\pi/4}{\log{|2\sin\theta|} d\theta} = 7.32772...$	

== Arbitrary manifolds ==
More generally, the hyperbolic volume may be defined for any hyperbolic 3-manifold. The Weeks manifold has the smallest possible volume of any closed manifold (a manifold that, unlike link complements, has no cusps); its volume is approximately 0.9427.

Thurston and Jørgensen proved that the set of real numbers that are hyperbolic volumes of orientable 3-manifolds is well-ordered, with order type ω^{ω}. For each 0 ≤ k < l, each volume of a manifold with exactly l cusps is a limit point of a sequence of manifolds with k cusps, and every convergent sequence of volumes is obtainable by Dehn surgeries on a manifold at the limiting volume; volumes of closed manifolds are exactly the isolated points. The smallest limit point in this set of volumes is given by the knot complement of the figure-eight knot, and the smallest limit point of limit points is given by the complement of the Whitehead link.
