= Knot complement =

Complement of a knot in three-sphere

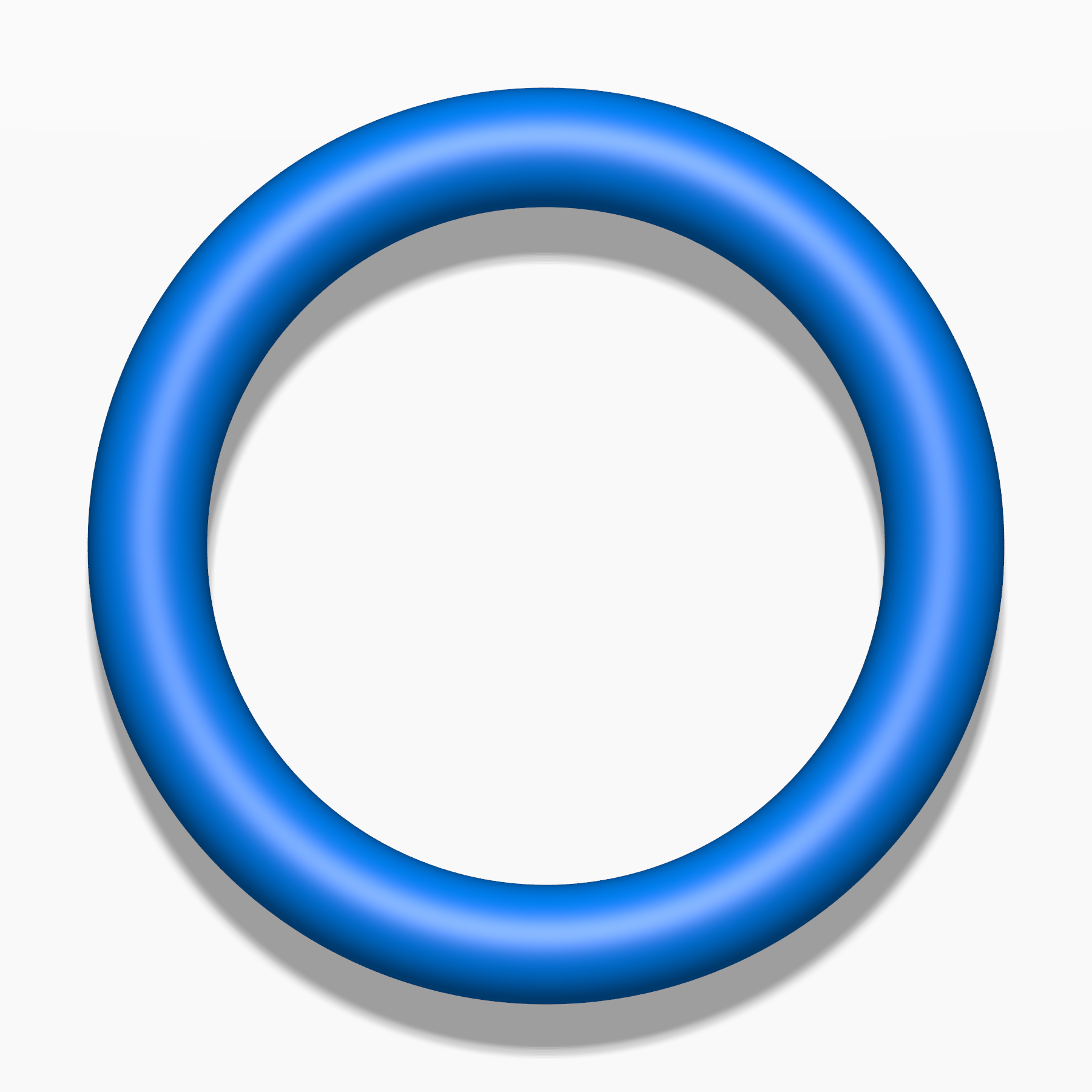
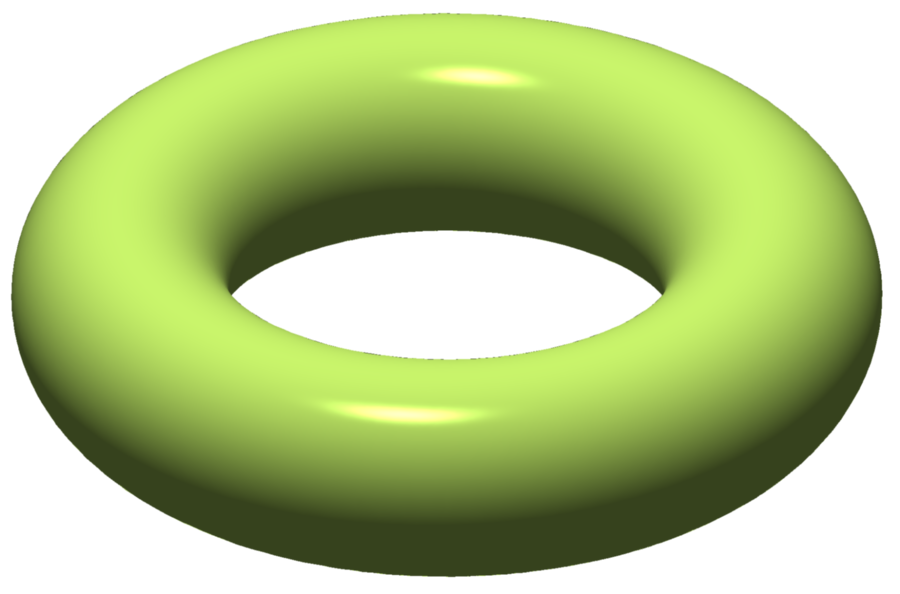
The knot complement of the unknot is homeomorphic to a solid torus - notice that while the unknot itself can be represented as a torus, the hole in the unknot corresponds to the solid region of the complement, while the knot itself is the hole in the complement. This is connected to the trivial Heegaard decomposition of the 3-sphere into two solid tori.

In mathematics, the knot complement of a tame knot K is the space where the knot is not. If a knot is embedded in the 3-sphere, then the complement is the 3-sphere minus the space near the knot. To make this precise, suppose that K is a knot in a three-manifold M (most often, M is the 3-sphere). Let N be a tubular neighborhood of K; so N is a solid torus. The knot complement is then the complement of N,

$$X_K = M - \mbox{interior}(N).$$

The knot complement X_{K} is a compact 3-manifold; the boundary of X_{K} and the boundary of the neighborhood N are homeomorphic to a two-torus. Sometimes the ambient manifold M is understood to be the 3-sphere. Context is needed to determine the usage. There are analogous definitions for the link complement.

Many knot invariants, such as the knot group, are really invariants of the complement of the knot. When the ambient space is the three-sphere no information is lost: the Gordon–Luecke theorem states that a knot is determined by its complement. That is, if K and K′ are two knots with homeomorphic complements then there is a homeomorphism of the three-sphere taking one knot to the other.

Knot complements are Haken manifolds. More generally complements of links are Haken manifolds.

== See also ==
- Knot genus
- Seifert surface
