= Stick number =

Smallest number of edges of an equivalent polygonal path for a knot

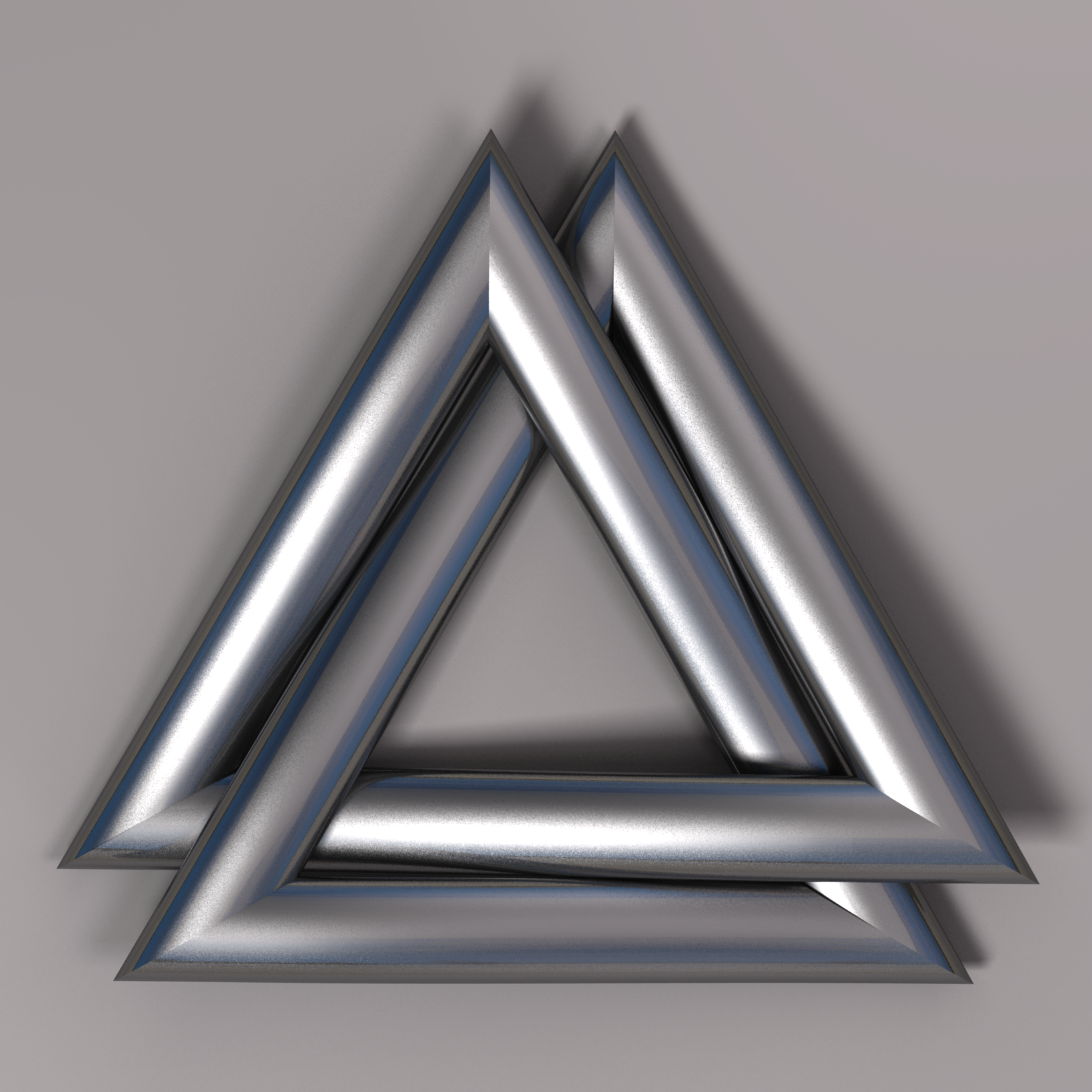
2,3 torus (or trefoil) knot has a stick number of six.

In the mathematical theory of knots, the stick number is a knot invariant that intuitively gives the smallest number of straight "sticks" stuck end to end needed to form a knot. Specifically, given any knot $K$, the stick number of $K$, denoted by $\operatorname{stick}(K)$, is the smallest number of edges of a polygonal path equivalent to $K$. A related quantity is the equilateral stick number, the smallest number of edges of the same length that are required to form a knot. It is not currently known whether the equilateral stick number is the same as the stick number for every knot.

== Known values ==
Six is the lowest stick number for any nontrivial knot. There are few knots whose stick number can be determined exactly. Gyo Taek Jin determined the stick number of a $(p,q)$-torus knot $T(p,q)$ in case the parameters $p$ and $q$ are not too far from each other:

$\operatorname{stick}(T(p,q)) = 2q$, if $2 \le p < q \le 2p.$

The same result was found independently around the same time by a research group around Colin Adams, but for a smaller range of parameters.

There are certain knots for which the upper bound and lower bound of the stick number are the same, such that the stick number is known exactly. These include 3_{1} with a stick number of 6, 4_{1} (7), all 5 and 6 crossing knots (8), and all 7 crossing knots (9). The 8 crossing knots 16 through 21 in Alexander-Briggs notation (8 or 9), and 9-crossing knots 29, 34, 35, and 39 through 49 (9), and 10_{124} (10, a torus knot) have known crossing numbers. There are 19 additional non-alternating 11- and 13-crossing knots with a stick number of exactly 10.

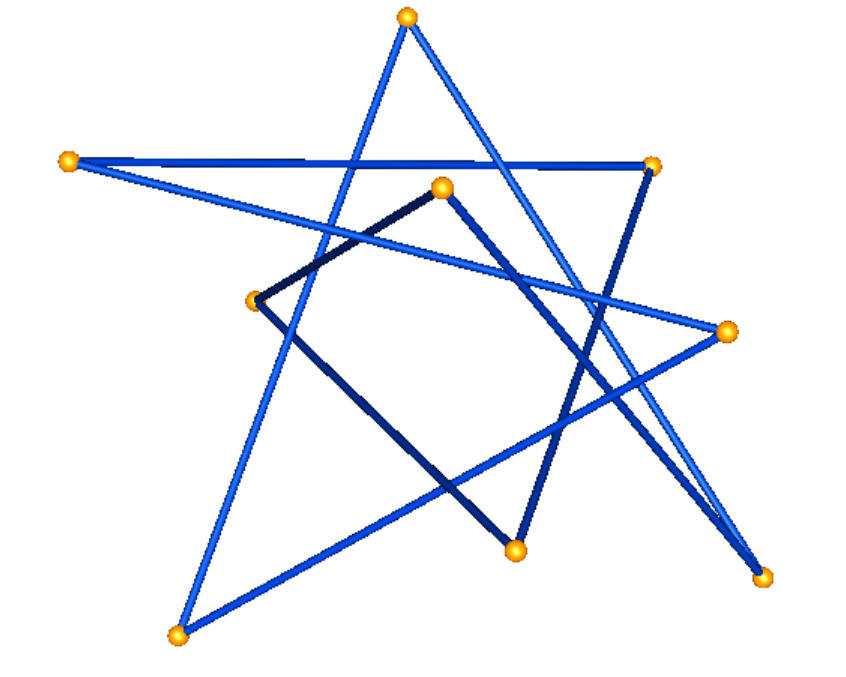
Rendering of a 9_{35} knot with a stick number of 9, from coordinates found by Shonkwiler and Eddy.

== Bounds ==
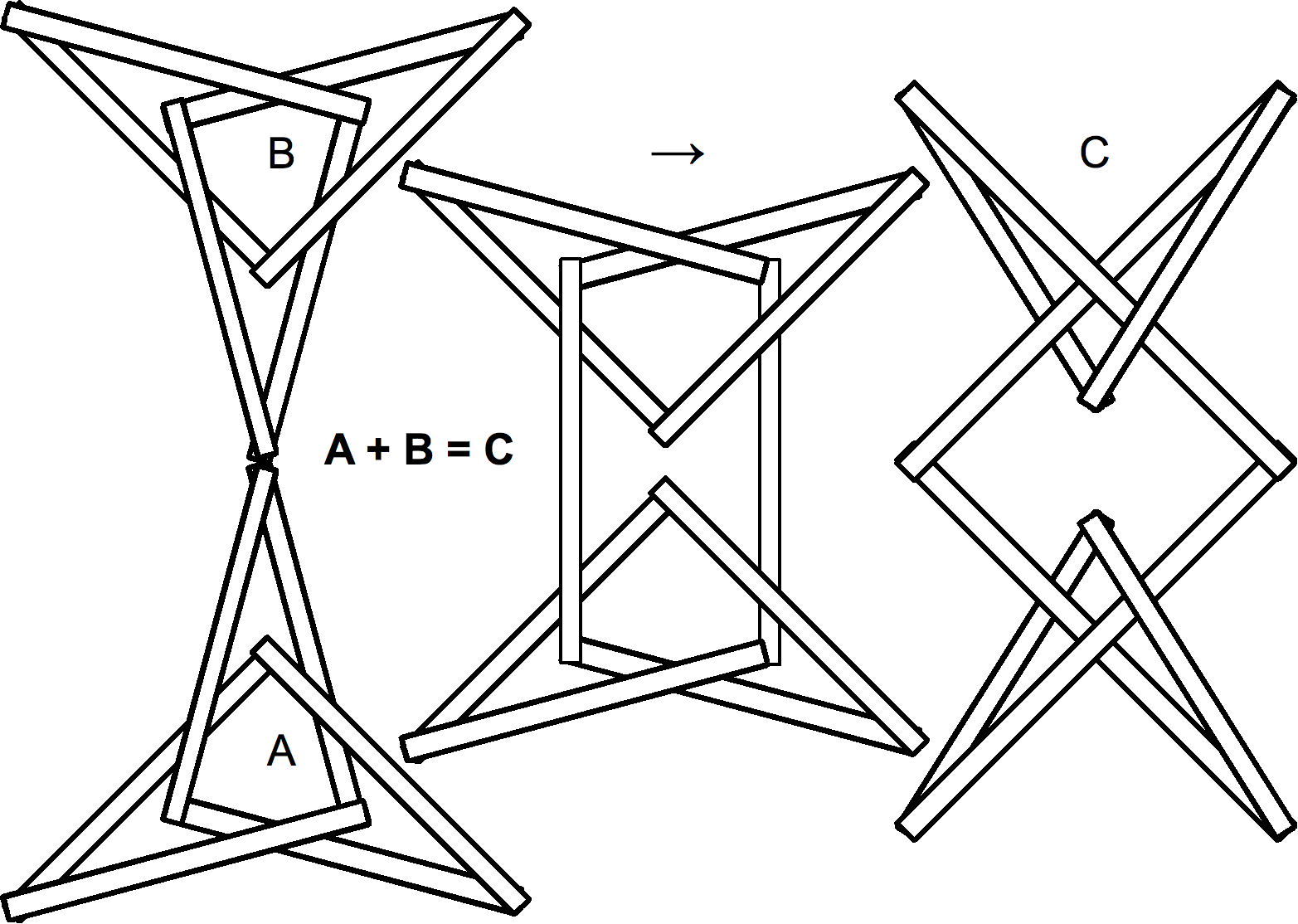
Square knot = trefoil + trefoil reflection.

The stick number of a knot sum can be upper bounded by the stick numbers of the summands:
$$\text{stick}(K_1\#K_2)\le \text{stick}(K_1)+ \text{stick}(K_2)-3 \,$$

== Related invariants ==
The stick number of a knot $K$ is related to its crossing number $c(K)$ by the following inequalities:
$$\frac12(7+\sqrt{8\,\text{c}(K)+1}) \le \text{stick}(K)\le \frac32 (c(K)+1).$$

These inequalities are both tight for the trefoil knot, which has a crossing number of 3 and a stick number of 6. The upper bound on the stick number does not apply to the unknot, which has crossing number 0 but stick number 3.

== Optical Illusions ==
A right-handed interlaced pentagram, which is a diagram of a $5_1$ knot but cannot be realized in three dimensions without curving the line segments.

Knots can be drawn with fewer straight line segments than their stick number suggests should be possible. These diagrams are optical illusions, and three-dimensional embeddings of such knots would require the apparent lines to curve. An example is a five-segment interlaced pentagram, which is a valid diagram of the $5_1$ knot but cannot be realized with straight line segments. At least eight straight line segments are required to embed a $5_1$ knot.
