= Cinquefoil knot =

Mathematical knot with crossing number 5

Cinquefoil
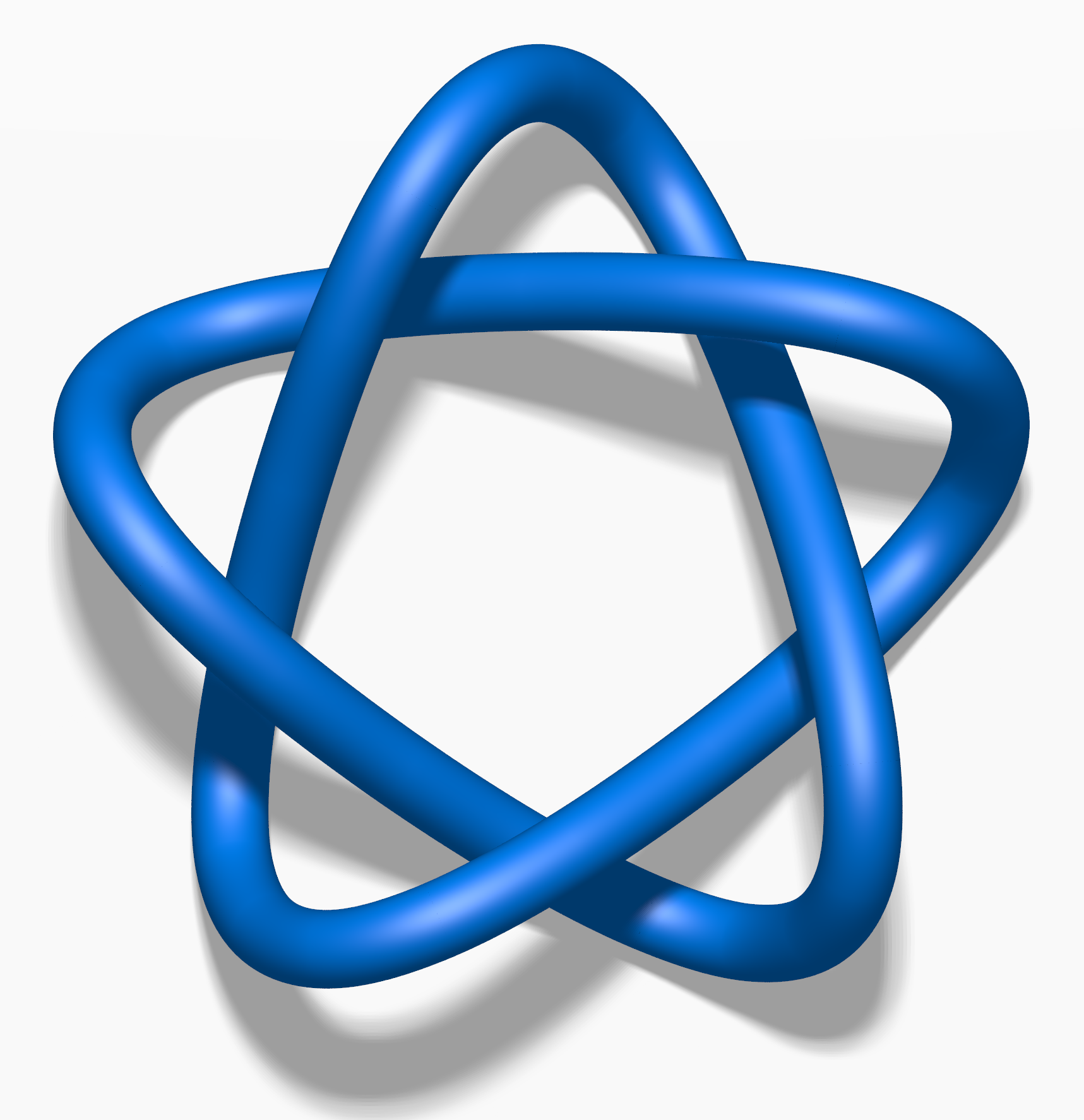
- Common name: Double overhand knot
- Arf invariant: 1
- Braid length: 5
- Braid no.: 2
- Bridge no.: 2
- Crosscap no.: 1
- Crossing no.: 5
- Genus: 2
- Hyperbolic volume: 0
- Stick no.: 8
- Unknotting no.: 2
- Conway notation: [5]
- A–B notation: 5_{1}
- Dowker notation: 6, 8, 10, 2, 4
- Last / Next: 4_{1} / 5_{2}

Other
- alternating, torus, fibered, prime, reversible

In knot theory, the cinquefoil knot, also known as Solomon's seal knot or the pentafoil knot, is one of two knots with crossing number five, the other being the three-twist knot. It is listed as the 5_{1} knot in the Alexander-Briggs notation, and can also be described as the (5,2)-torus knot. The cinquefoil is the closed version of the double overhand knot.

== Properties ==
The cinquefoil is a prime knot. Its writhe is 5, and it is invertible but not amphichiral. Its Alexander polynomial is

$$\Delta(t) = t^2 - t + 1 - t^{-1} + t^{-2}$$,

since
$$\begin{pmatrix}1 & -1 & 0&0\\ 0 & 1 &-1 &0 \\ 0& 0& 1&-1 \\ 0& 0& 0&1\end{pmatrix}$$
is a possible Seifert matrix, or because of its Conway polynomial, which is

$$\nabla(z) = z^4 + 3z^2 + 1$$,

and its Jones polynomial is

$$V(q) = q^{-2} + q^{-4} - q^{-5} + q^{-6} - q^{-7}.$$

These are the same as the Alexander, Conway, and Jones polynomials of the knot 10_{132}. However, the Kauffman polynomial can be used to distinguish between these two knots.

== History ==
The name "cinquefoil" comes from the five-petaled flowers of plants in the genus Potentilla.

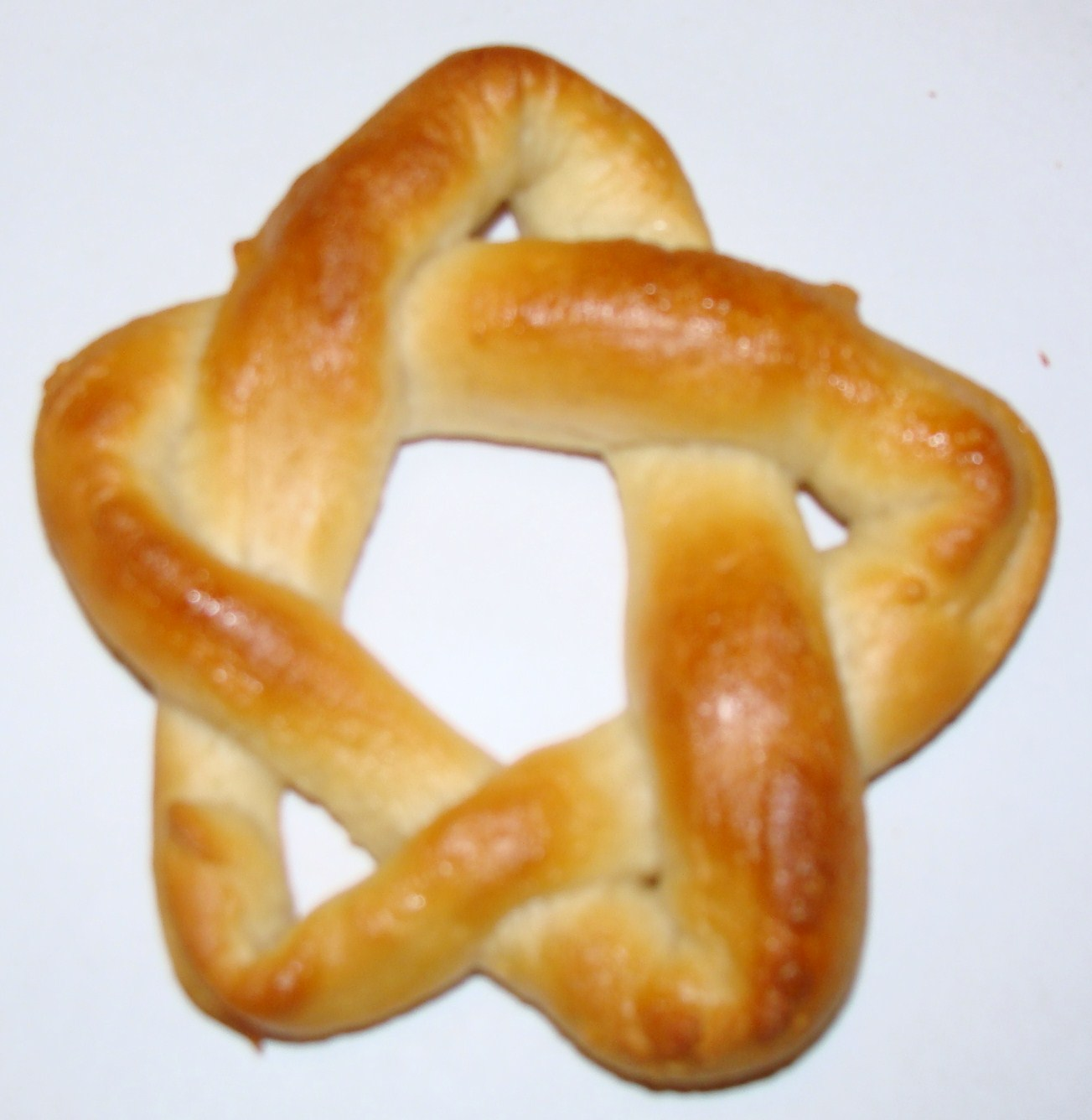
Edible cinquefoil knot.

== See also ==
- Pentagram
- Trefoil knot
- 7₁ knot
- Skein relation
