= 71 knot =

Mathematical knot with crossing number 7

7_{1} knot
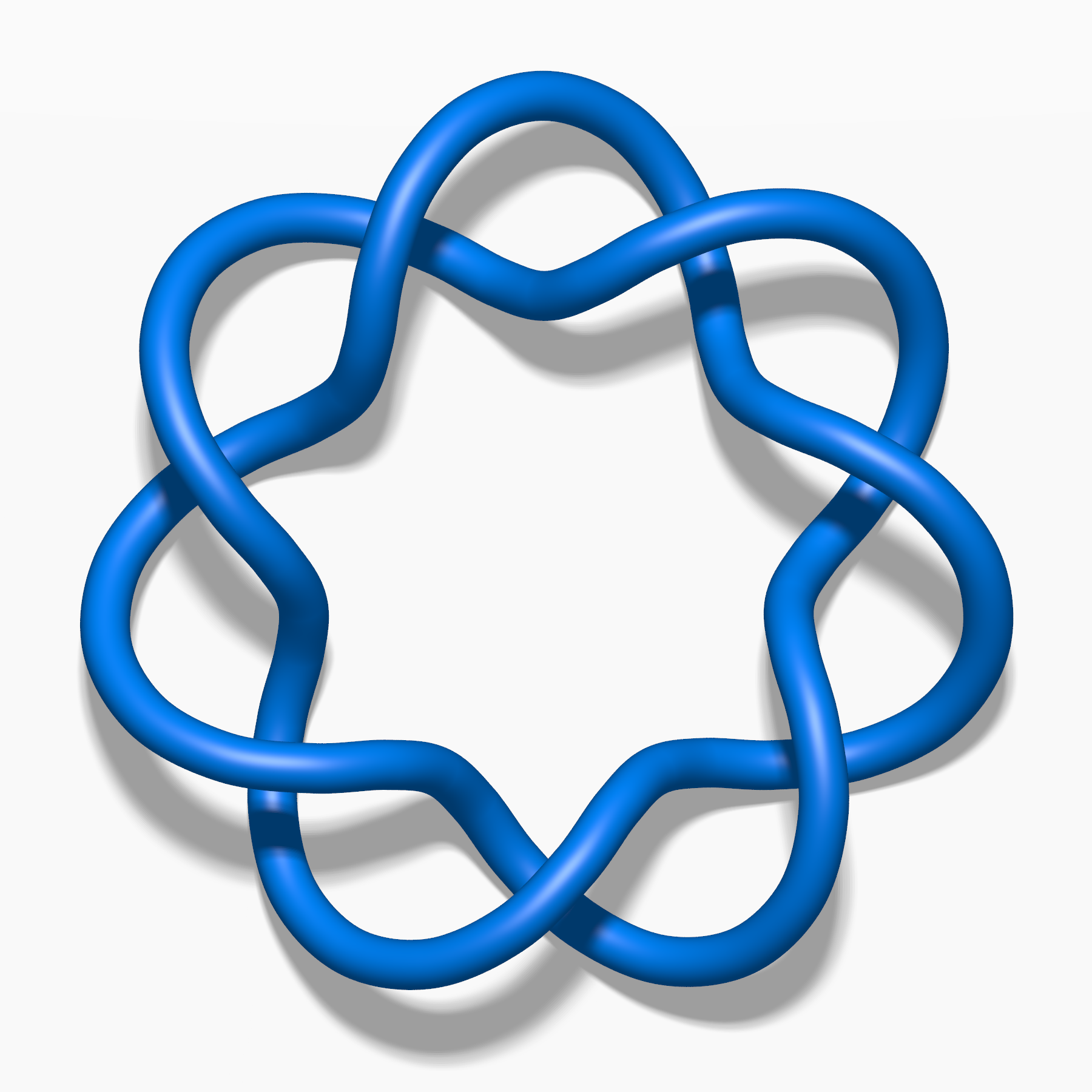
- Arf invariant: 0
- Braid length: 7
- Braid no.: 2
- Bridge no.: 2
- Crosscap no.: 1
- Crossing no.: 7
- Genus: 3
- Hyperbolic volume: 0
- Stick no.: 9
- Unknotting no.: 3
- Conway notation: [7]
- A–B notation: 7_{1}
- Dowker notation: 8, 10, 12, 14, 2, 4, 6
- Last / Next: 6_{3} / 7_{2}

Other
- alternating, torus, fibered, prime, reversible

In knot theory, the 7_{1} knot, also known as the septoil knot, the septafoil knot, or the (7, 2)-torus knot, is one of seven prime knots with crossing number seven. It is the simplest torus knot after the trefoil and cinquefoil. This knot is used to construct the simplest known counterexample to the conjecture that the unknotting number is additive under connected sum.

== Properties ==
The 7_{1} knot is invertible but not amphichiral. Its Alexander polynomial is

$$\Delta(t) = t^3 - t^2 + t - 1 + t^{-1} - t^{-2} + t^{-3}, \,$$

its Conway polynomial is

$$\nabla(z) = z^6 + 5z^4 + 6z^2 + 1, \,$$

and its Jones polynomial is

$V(q) = q^{-3} + q^{-5} - q^{-6} + q^{-7} - q^{-8} + q^{-9} - q^{-10}. \,$

== Example ==
Assembling of 7_{1} knot.

A 3D-printed model of the 7_{1} knot. The tube follows the (2,7) torus knot and encloses a channel in which loose steel balls roll.

== See also ==
- Heptagram
