= Three-twist knot =

Mathematical knot with crossing number 5

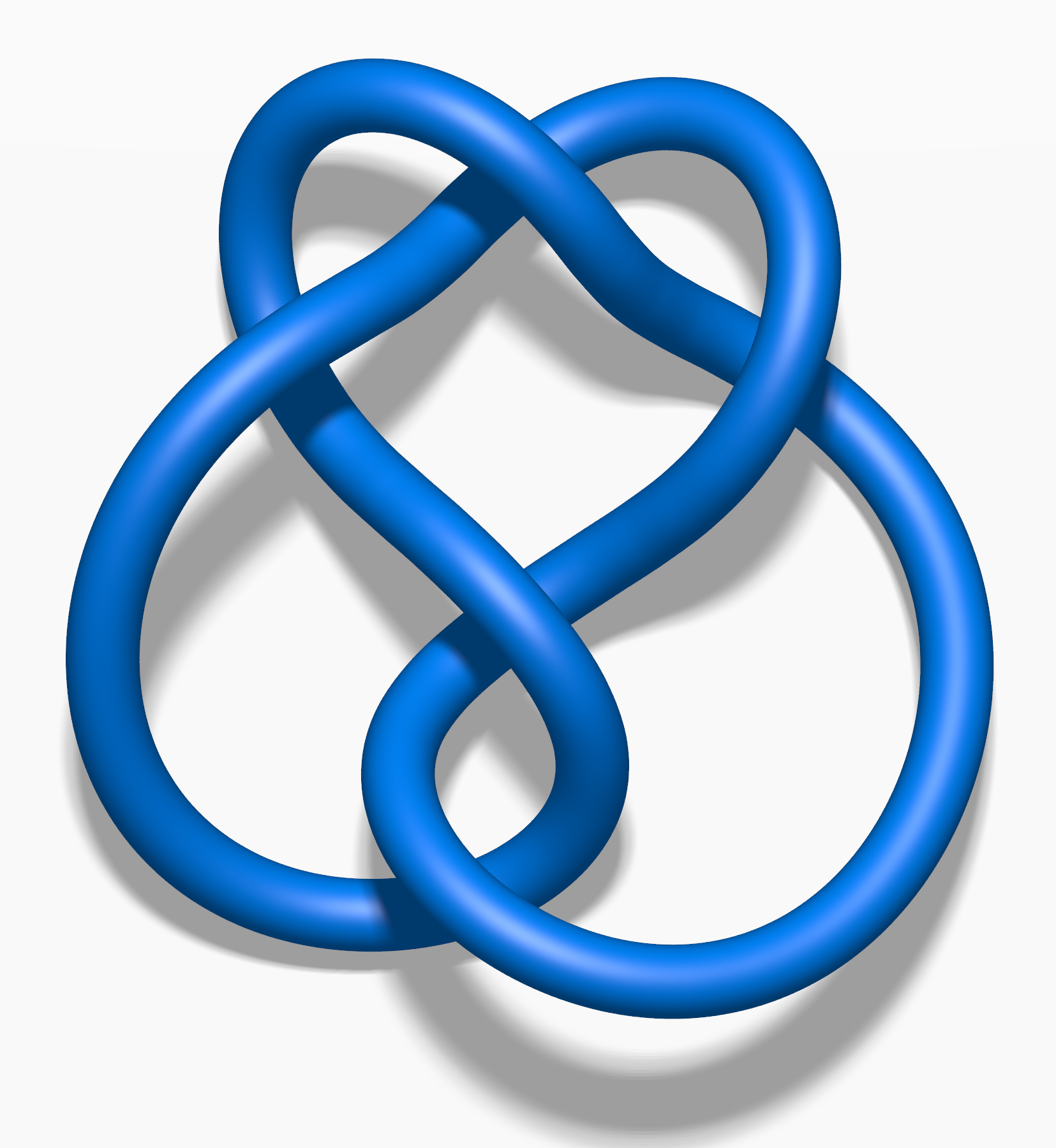
- Common name: Figure-of-nine knot
- Arf invariant: 0
- Braid length: 6
- Braid no.: 3
- Bridge no.: 2
- Crosscap no.: 2
- Crossing no.: 5
- Genus: 1
- Hyperbolic volume: 2.82812
- Stick no.: 8
- Unknotting no.: 1
- Conway notation: [32]
- A–B notation: 5_{2}
- Dowker notation: 4, 8, 10, 2, 6
- Last / Next: 5_{1} / 6_{1}

Other
- alternating, hyperbolic, prime, reversible, twist

In knot theory, the three-twist knot is the twist knot with three-half twists. It is listed as the 5_{2} knot in the Alexander-Briggs notation, and is one of two knots with crossing number five, the other being the cinquefoil knot.

The 5_{2} knot can be represented with the following parametric equation:

$$\begin{align}
x &=  \cos(2\phi) \\
y &=  \cos(5\phi + \pi/4) \\
z &=  \cos(2\phi + \pi/2) + \cos(3\phi + \pi/4)
\end{align}$$

with $0\leq\phi\leq 2\pi$.

== Properties ==
The three-twist knot is a prime knot, and it is invertible but not amphichiral. Its Alexander polynomial is

$$\Delta(t) = 2t-3+2t^{-1}, \,$$

since
$$\begin{pmatrix}1 & -1 \\ 0 & 2\end{pmatrix}$$
is a possible Seifert matrix, or because of its Conway polynomial, which is

$$\nabla(z) = 2z^2+1, \,$$

and its Jones polynomial is

$V(q) = q^{-1} - q^{-2} + 2q^{-3} - q^{-4} + q^{-5} - q^{-6}. \,$

Because the Alexander polynomial is not monic, the three-twist knot is not fibered.

The three-twist knot is a hyperbolic knot, with its complement having a volume of approximately 2.82812.

If the fibre of the knot in the initial image of this page were cut at the bottom right of the image, and the ends were pulled apart, it would result in a single-stranded figure-of-nine knot (not the figure-of-nine loop).

== Example ==
Assembling of Three-twist knot.
