= Stevedore knot (mathematics) =

Mathematical knot with crossing number 6

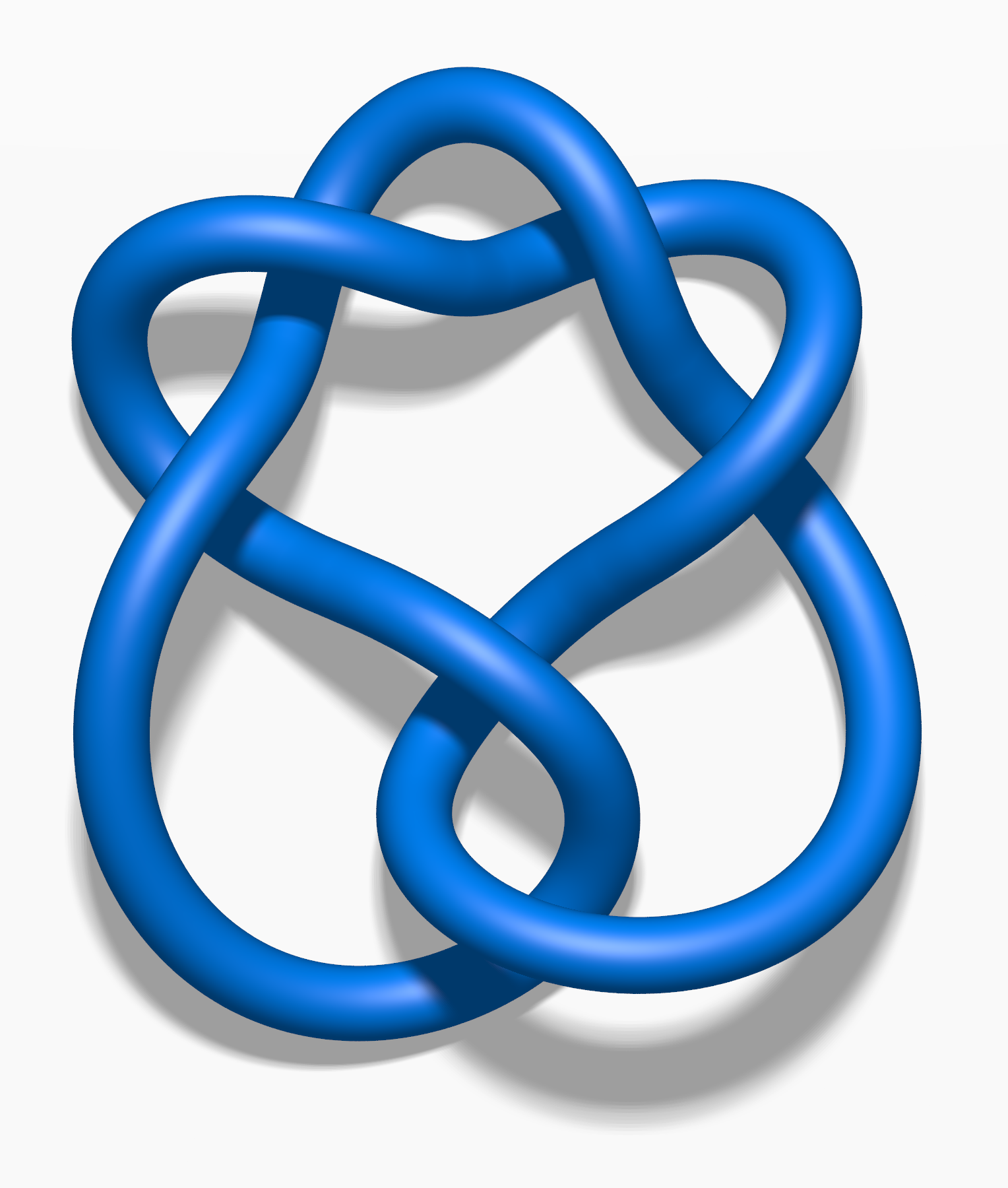
- Common name: Stevedore knot
- Arf invariant: 0
- Braid length: 7
- Braid no.: 4
- Bridge no.: 2
- Crosscap no.: 2
- Crossing no.: 6
- Genus: 1
- Hyperbolic volume: 3.16396
- Stick no.: 8
- Unknotting no.: 1
- Conway notation: [42]
- A–B notation: 6_{1}
- Dowker notation: 4, 8, 12, 10, 2, 6
- Last / Next: 5_{2} / 6_{2}

Other
- alternating, hyperbolic, pretzel, prime, slice, reversible, tricolorable, twist

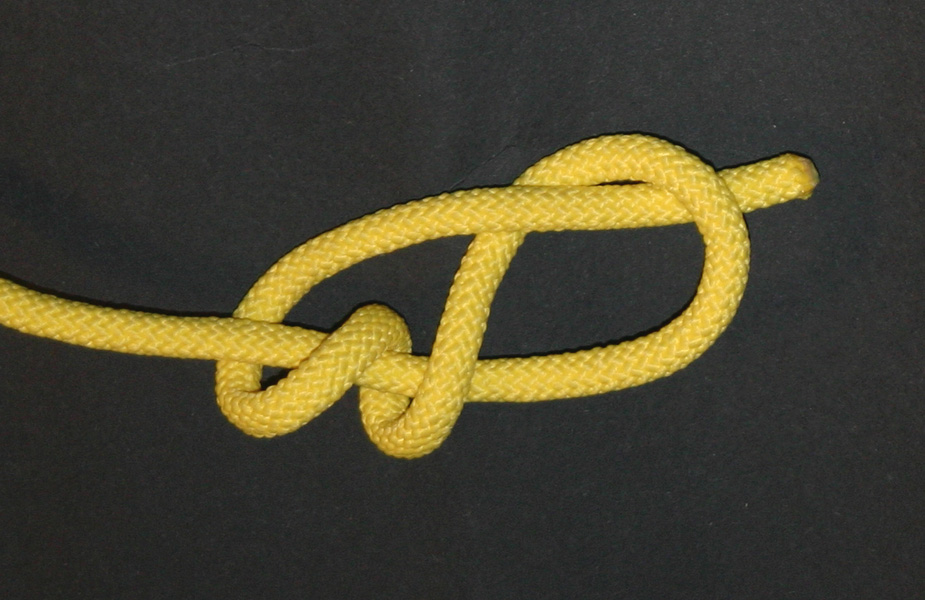
The common stevedore knot. If the ends were joined together, the result would be equivalent to the mathematical knot.

In knot theory, the stevedore knot is one of three prime knots with crossing number six, the others being the 6_{2} knot and the 6_{3} knot. The stevedore knot is listed as the 6_{1} knot in the Alexander–Briggs notation, and it can also be described as a twist knot with four half twists, or as the (5,−1,−1) pretzel knot.

The mathematical stevedore knot is named after the common stevedore knot, which is often used as a stopper at the end of a rope. The mathematical version of the knot can be obtained from the common version by joining together the two loose ends of the rope, forming a knotted loop.

The stevedore knot is invertible but not amphichiral. Its Alexander polynomial is

$$\Delta(t) = -2t+5-2t^{-1}, \,$$

its Conway polynomial is

$$\nabla(z) = 1-2z^2, \,$$

and its Jones polynomial is

$V(q) = q^2-q+2-2q^{-1}+q^{-2}-q^{-3}+q^{-4}. \,$

The Alexander polynomial and Conway polynomial are the same as those for the knot 9_{46}, but the Jones polynomials for these two knots are different. Because the Alexander polynomial is not monic, the stevedore knot is not fibered.

The stevedore knot is a ribbon knot, and is therefore also a slice knot.

The stevedore knot is a hyperbolic knot, with its complement having a volume of approximately 3.16396.

== See also ==
- Figure-eight knot (mathematics)
