= Unknotting number =

Minimum number of times a specific knot must be passed through itself to become untied

Trefoil knot without 3-fold symmetry being unknotted by one crossing switch.

Whitehead link being unknotted by undoing one crossing

In the mathematical area of knot theory, the unknotting number of a knot is the minimum number of times the knot must be passed through itself (crossing switch) to untie it. If a knot has unknotting number $n$, then there exists a diagram of the knot which can be changed to unknot by switching $n$ crossings. The unknotting number of a knot is always less than half of its crossing number. This invariant was first defined by Hilmar Wendt in 1936.

Any composite knot has unknotting number at least two, and therefore every knot with unknotting number one is a prime knot. The unknotting number is not additive under connected sum, although that possibility, implicit in [Wendt,1937] and explicitly asked by Gordon in 1977 and many others, was not resolved until 2025. A counterexample showed that the unknotting number of the connected sum of 7_{1} and its mirror image was at most 5, one less than the sum of the numbers from its components.

The following table show the unknotting numbers for the first few knots:

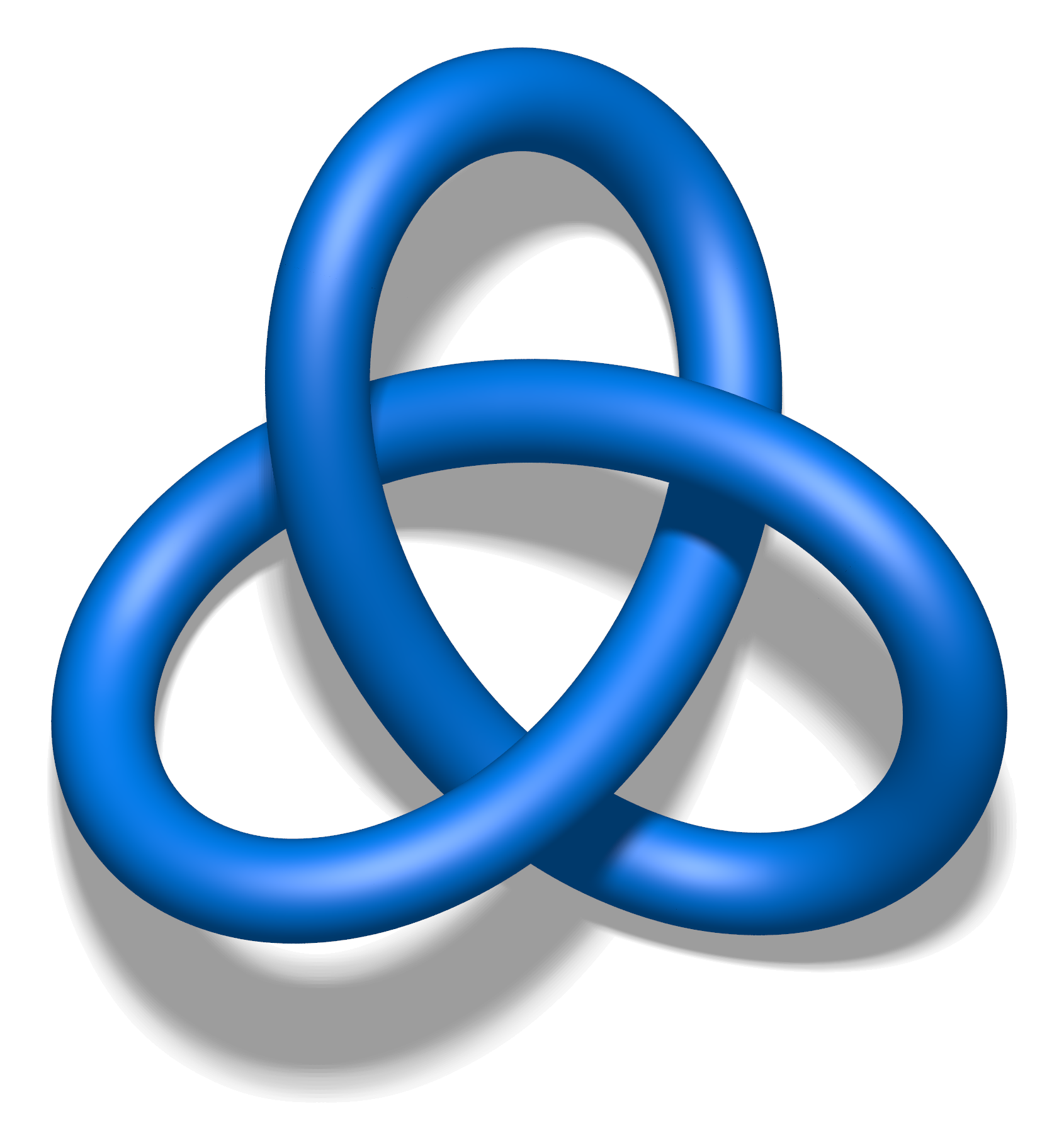
Trefoil knot
unknotting number 1

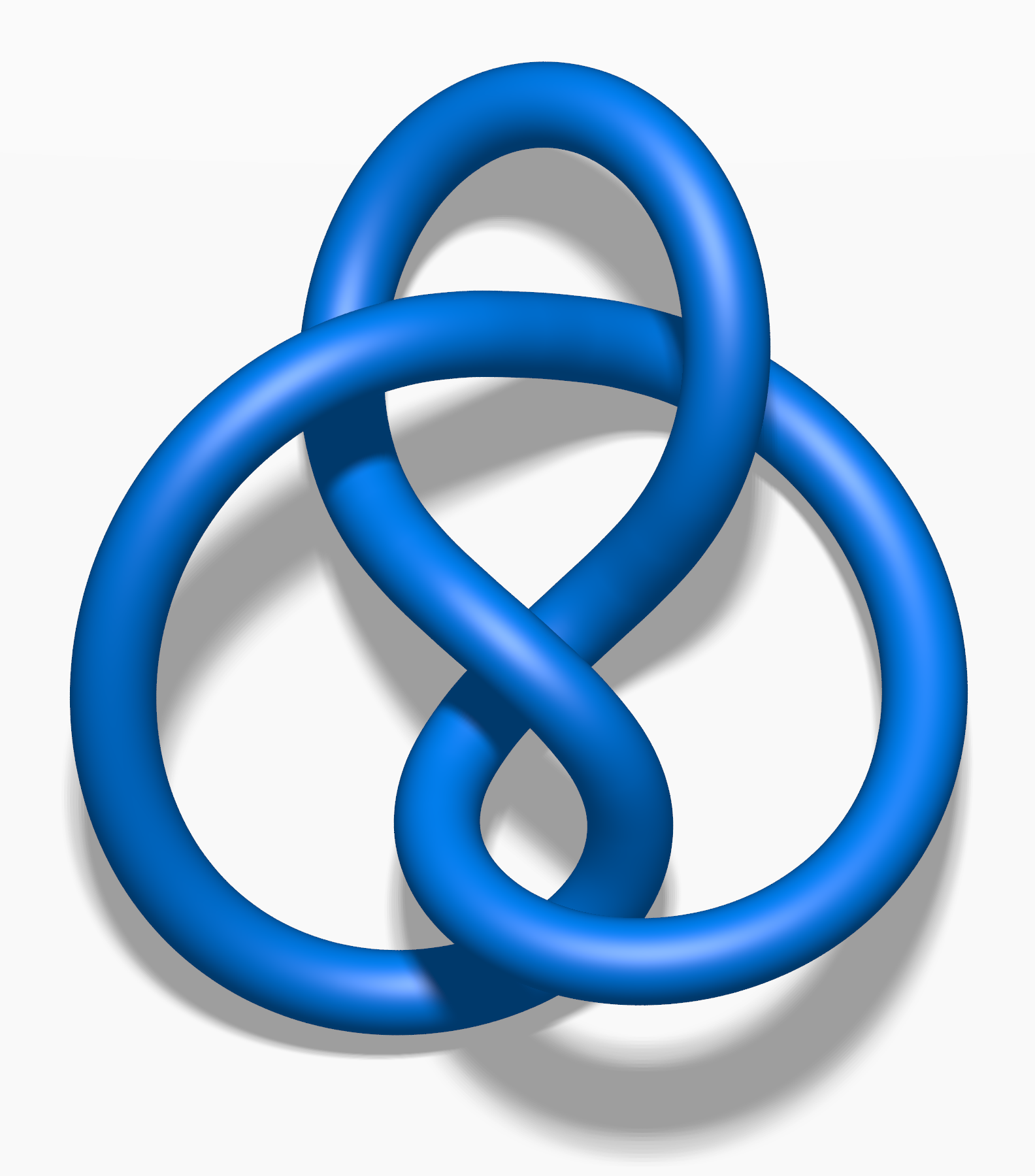
Figure-eight knot
unknotting number 1

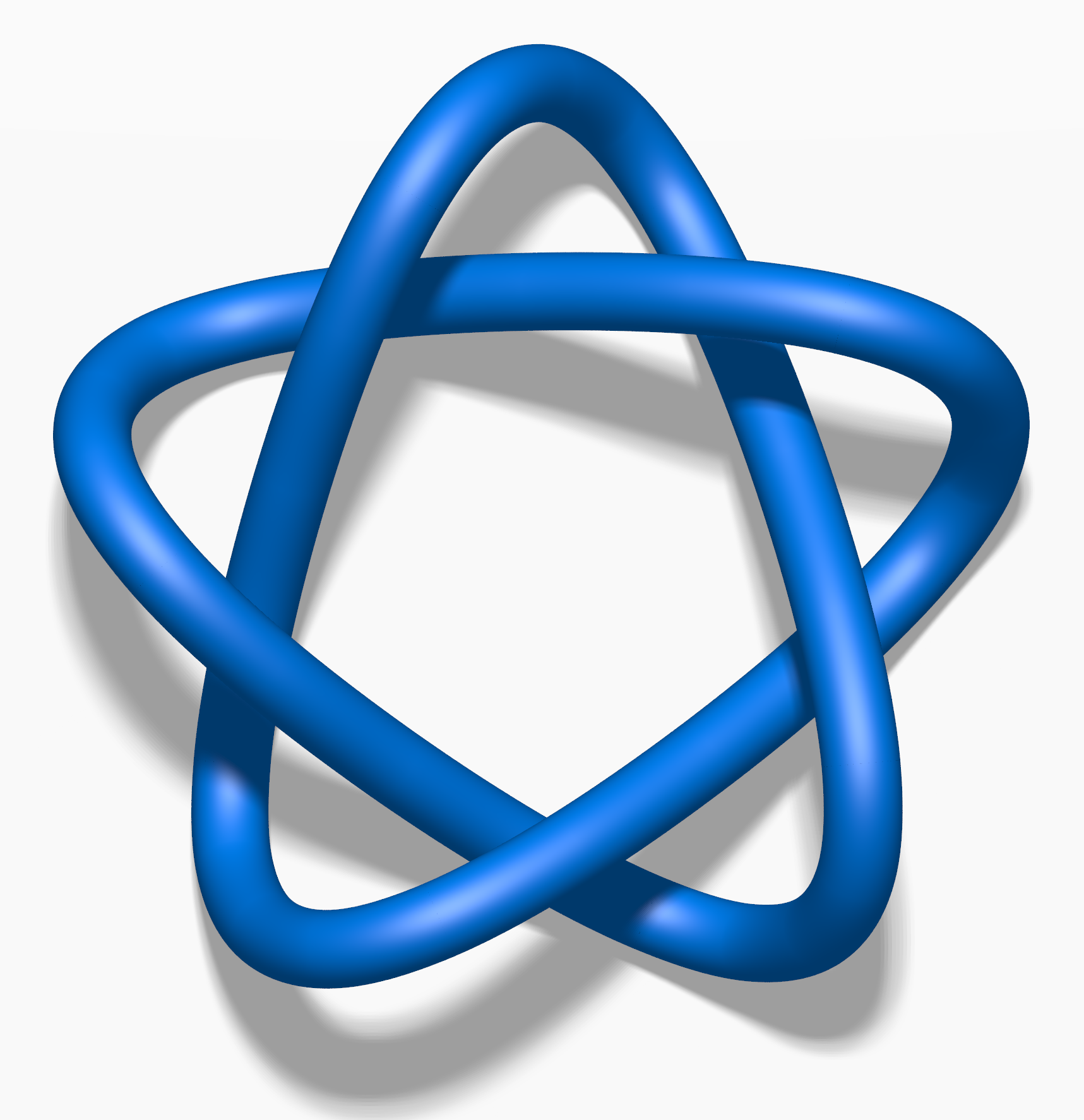
Cinquefoil knot
unknotting number 2

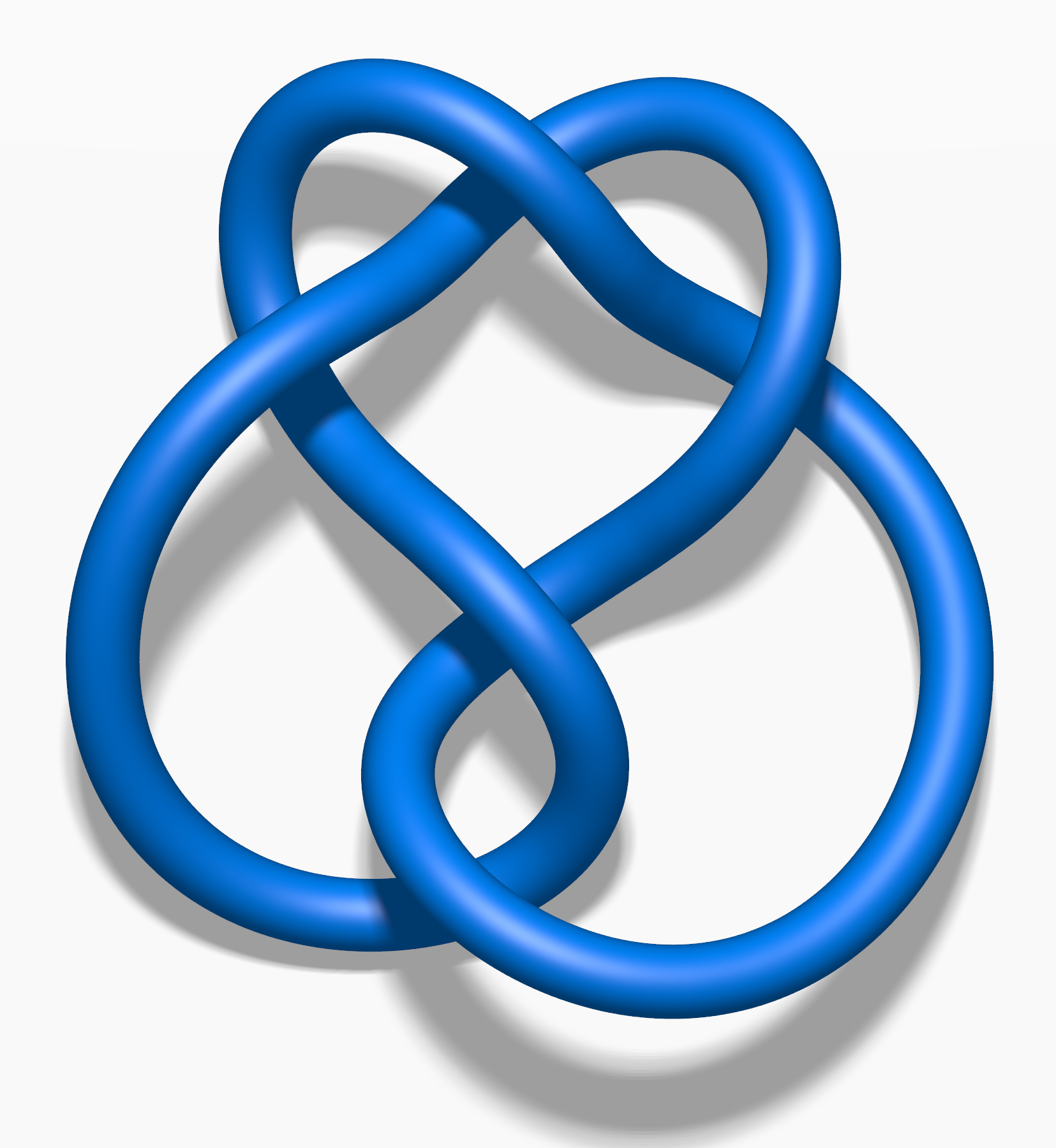
Three-twist knot
unknotting number 1

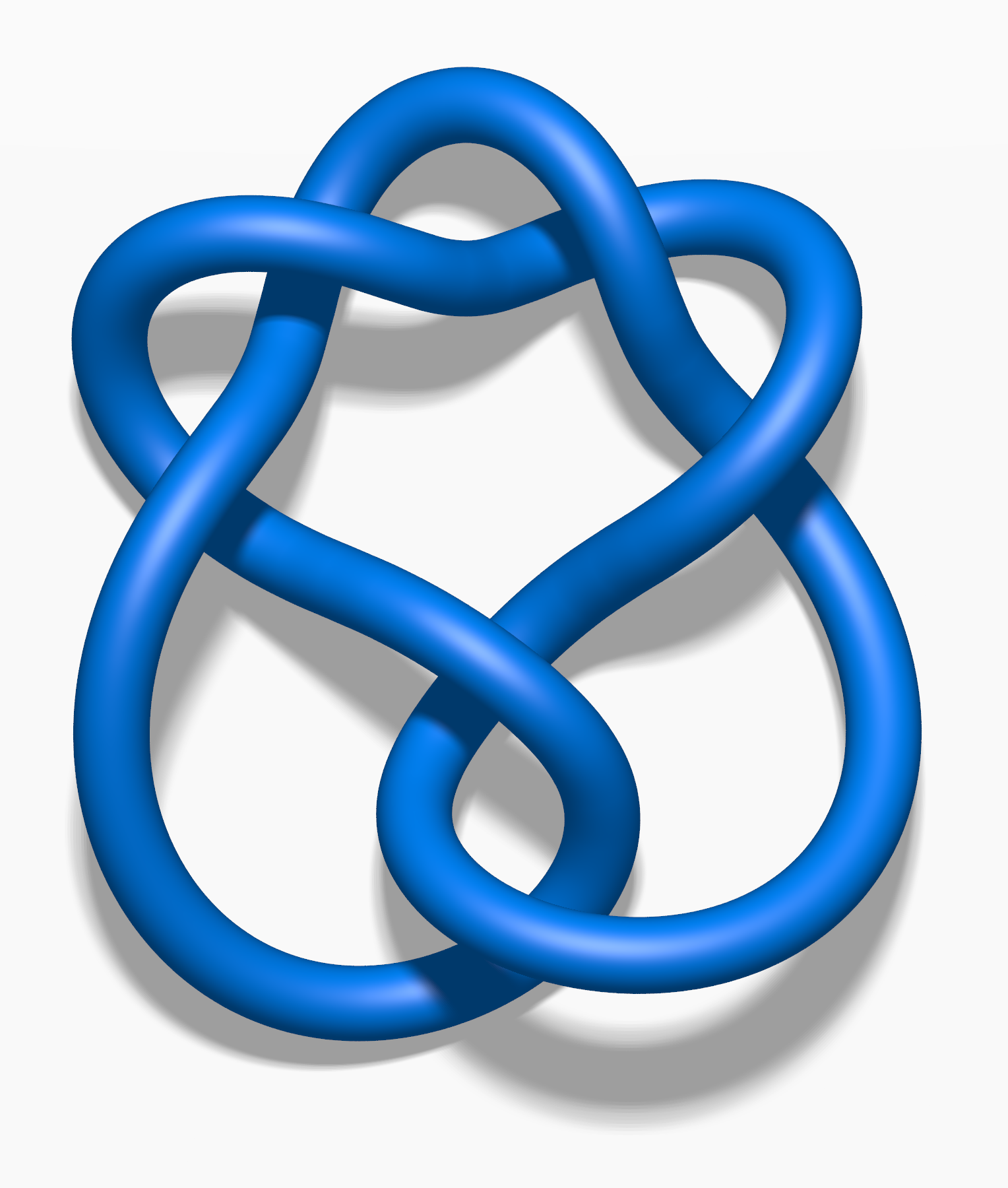
Stevedore knot
unknotting number 1

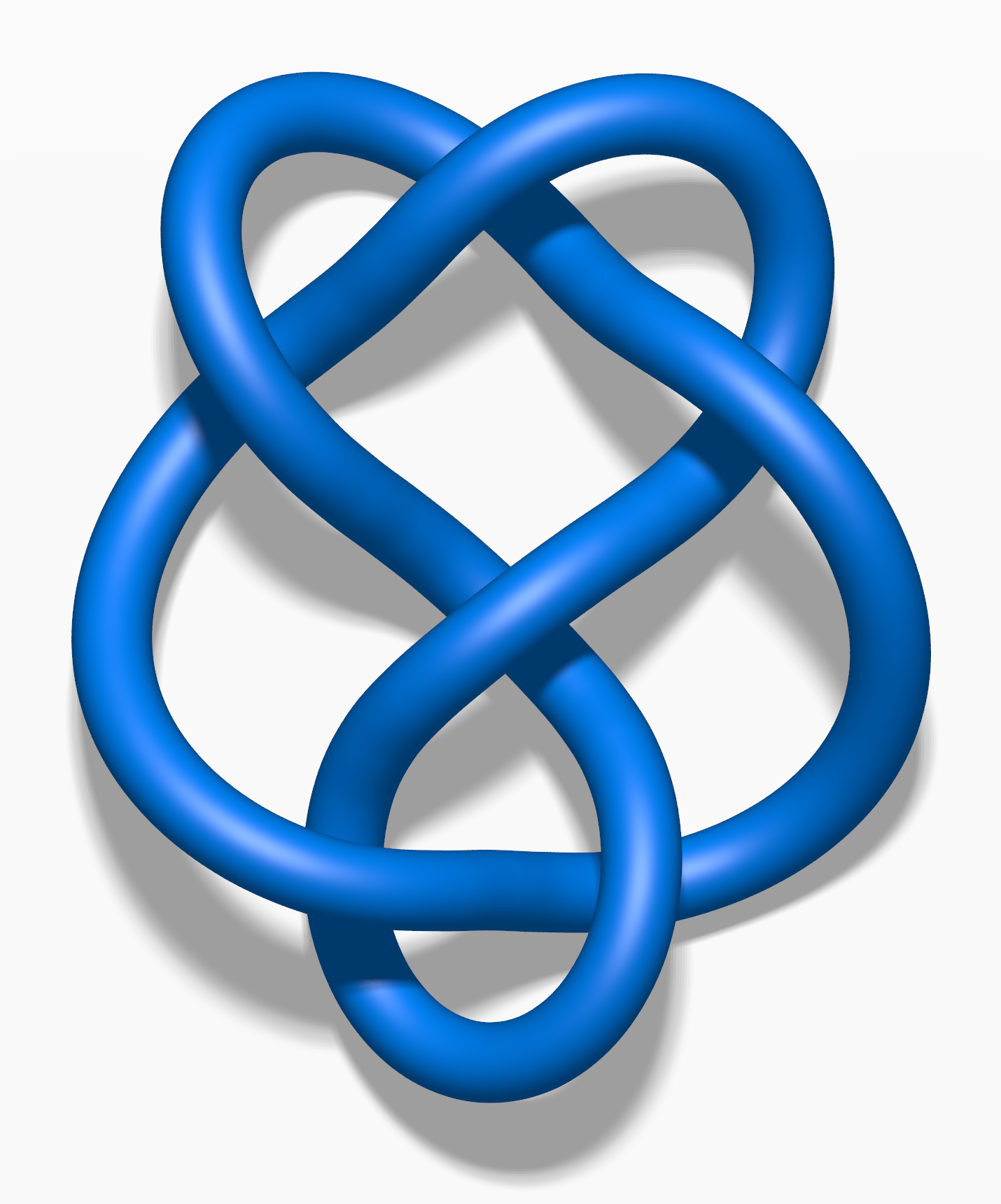
6_{2} knot
unknotting number 1

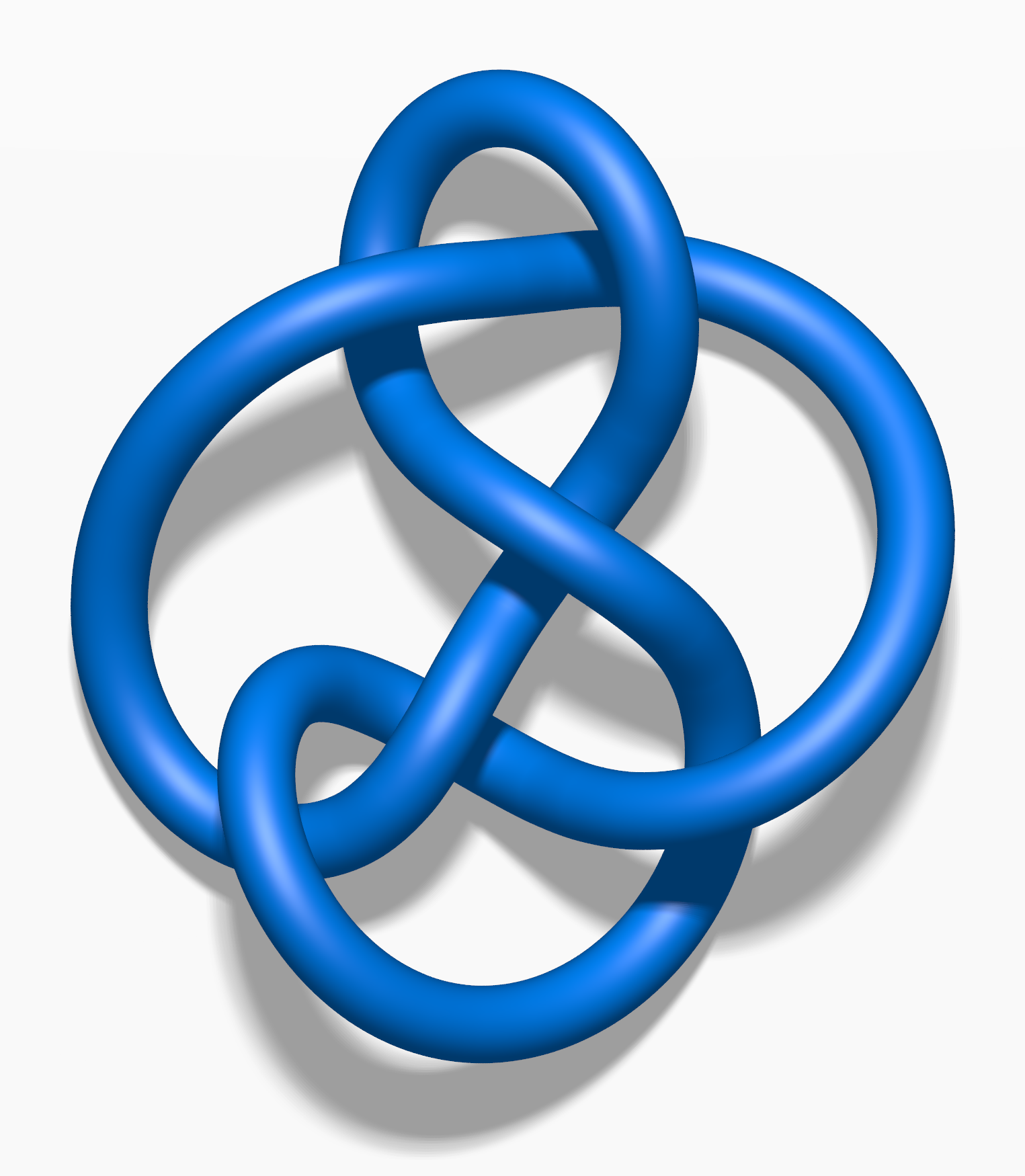
6_{3} knot
unknotting number 1

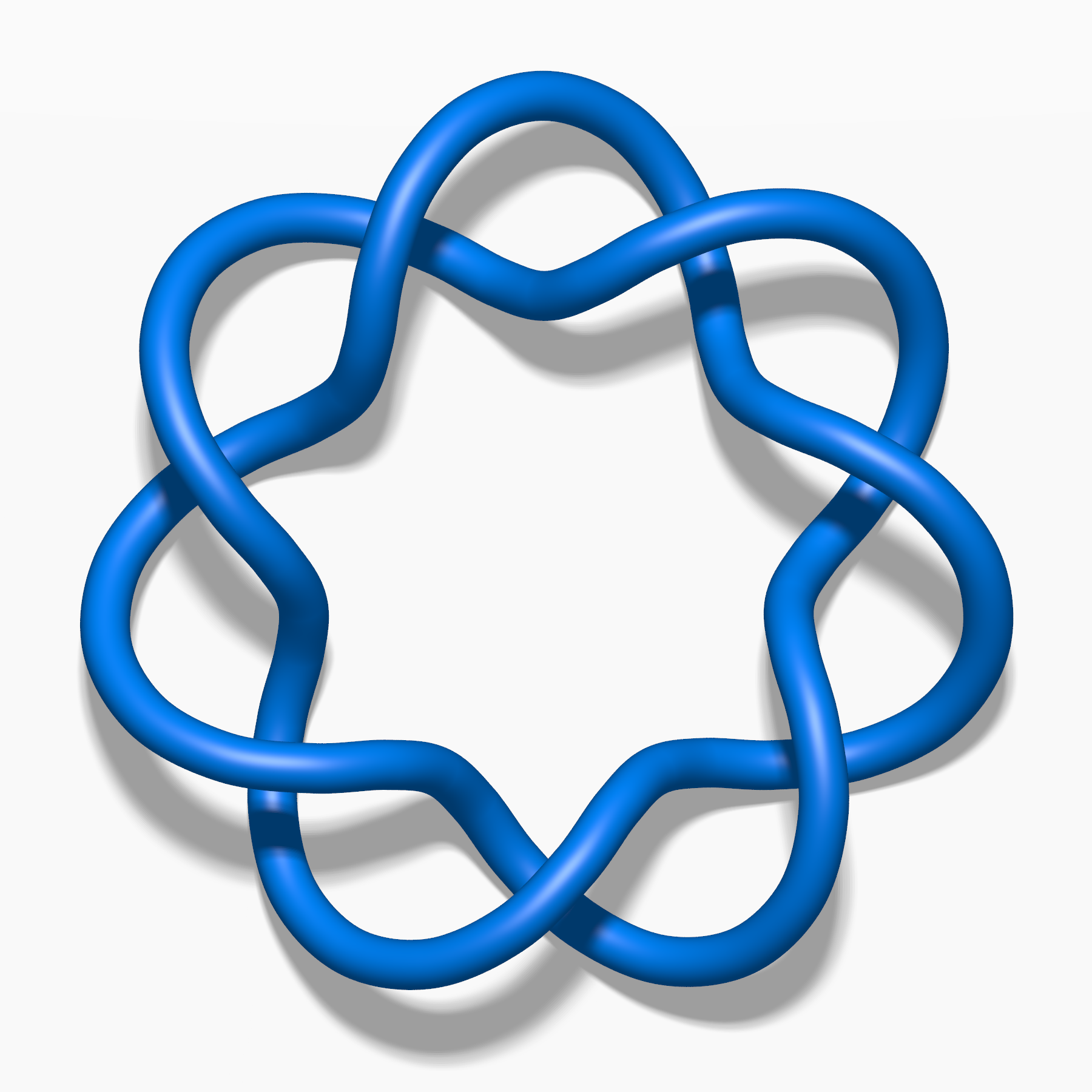
7_{1} knot
unknotting number 3

In general, it is relatively difficult to determine the unknotting number of a given knot. Known cases include:

- The unknotting number of a nontrivial twist knot is always equal to one.
- The unknotting number of a $(p,q)$-torus knot is equal to $(p-1)(q-1)/2$.
- The unknotting numbers of prime knots with nine or fewer crossings have all been determined. (The unknotting number of the 10_{11} prime knot is unknown.)

== Other numerical knot invariants ==
- Crossing number
- Bridge number
- Linking number
- Stick number

== See also ==
- Unknotting problem
