= Twist knot =

Family of mathematical knots

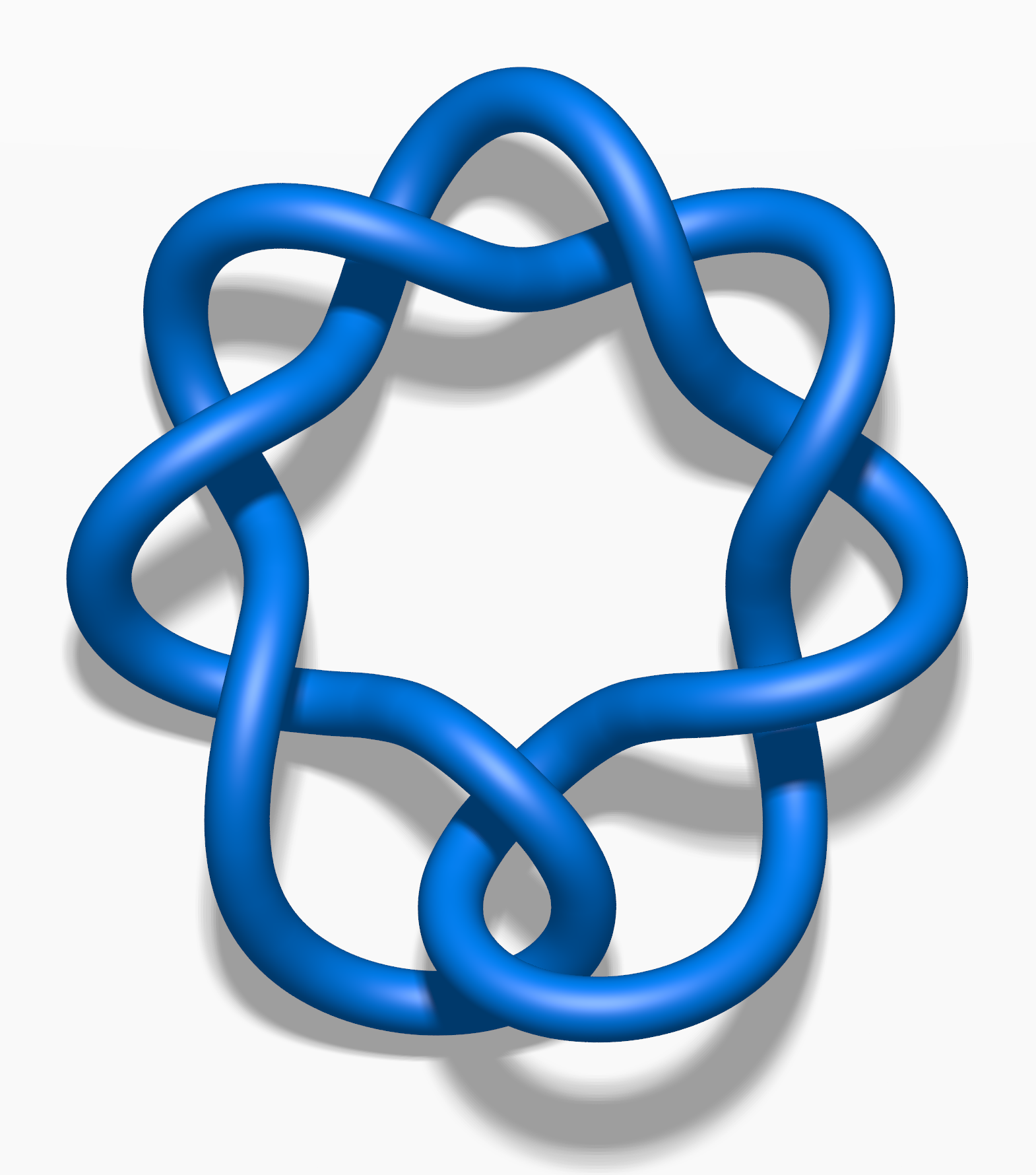
A twist knot with six half-twists.

In knot theory, a branch of mathematics, a twist knot is a knot obtained by repeatedly twisting a closed loop and then linking the ends together. (That is, a twist knot is any Whitehead double of an unknot.) The twist knots are an infinite family of knots, and are considered the simplest type of knots after the torus knots.

== Construction ==
A twist knot is obtained by linking together the two ends of a twisted loop. Any number of half-twists may be introduced into the loop before linking, resulting in an infinite family of possibilities. The following figures show the first few twist knots:

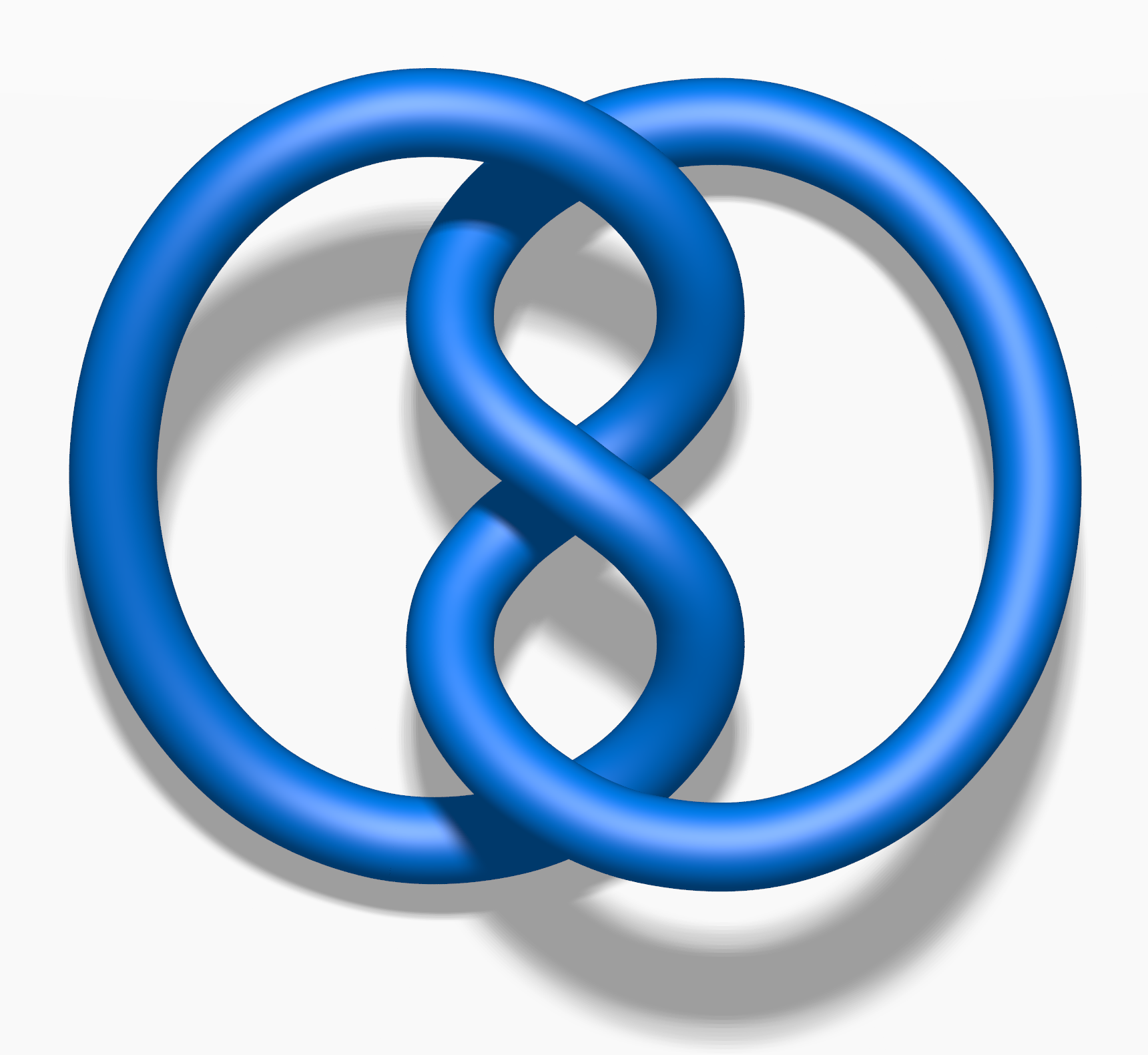
One half-twist
(trefoil knot, 3_{1})

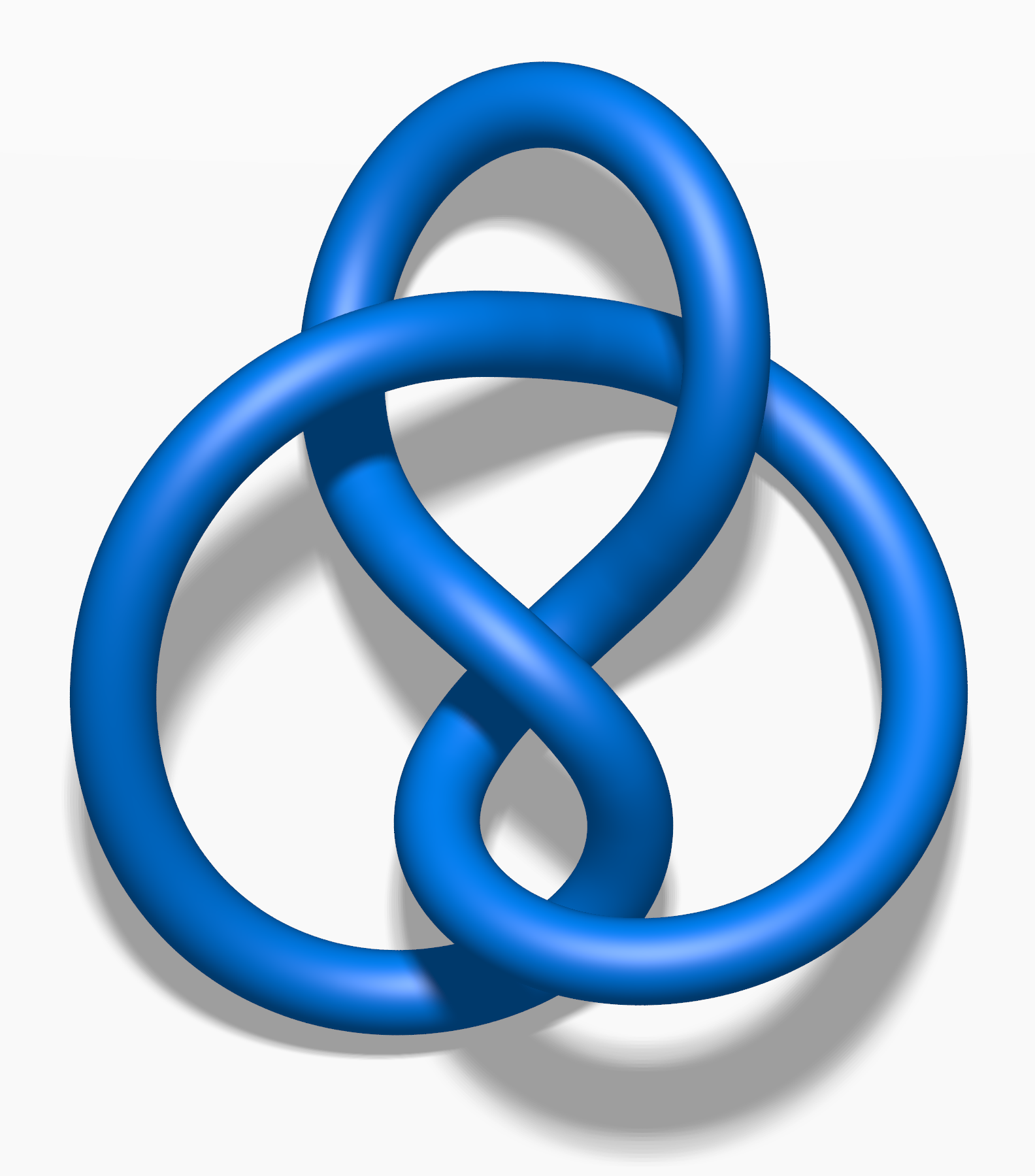
Two half-twists
(figure-eight knot, 4_{1})

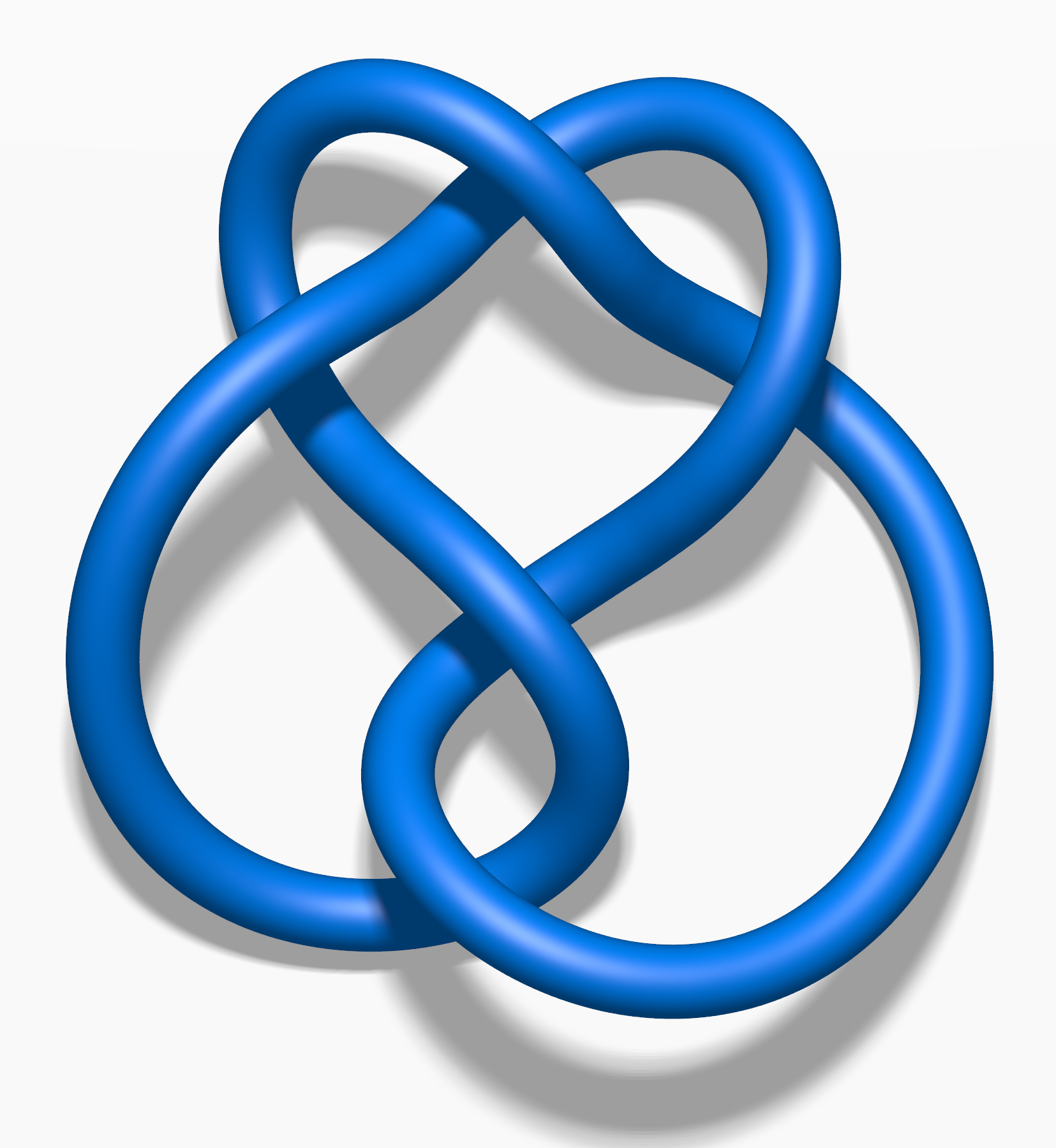
Three half-twists
(5_{2} knot)

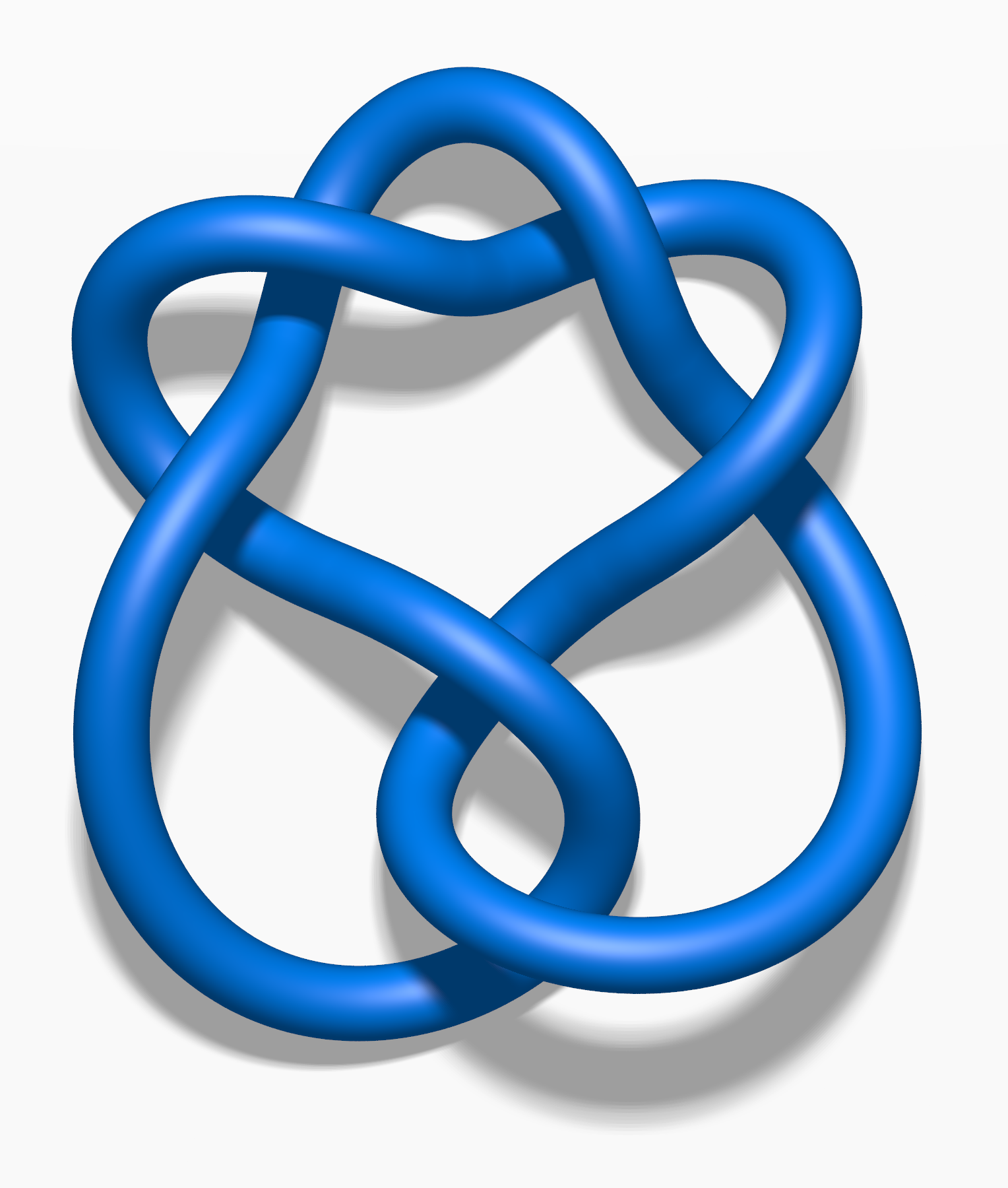
Four half-twists
(stevedore knot, 6_{1})

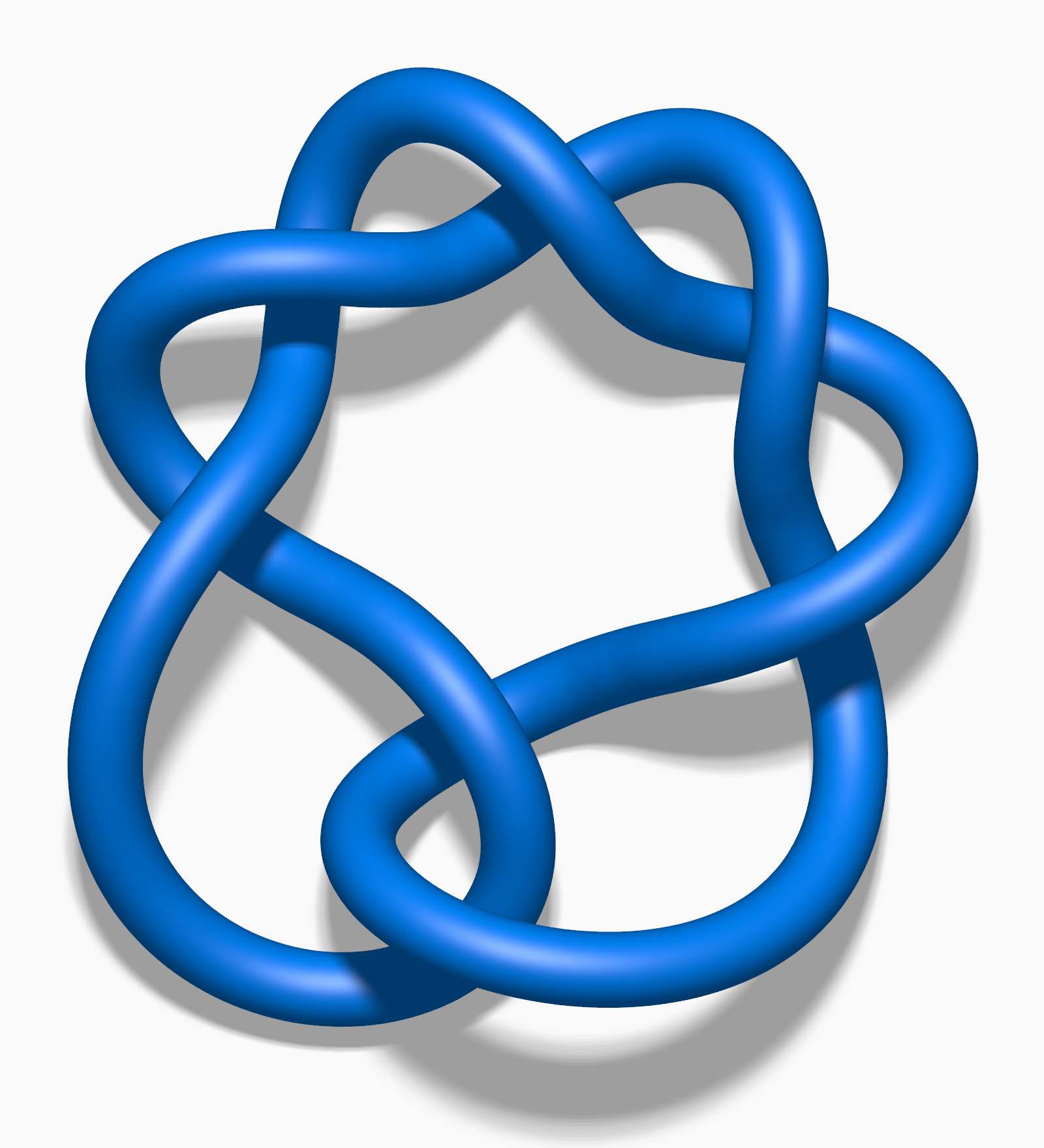
Five half-twists
(7_{2} knot)

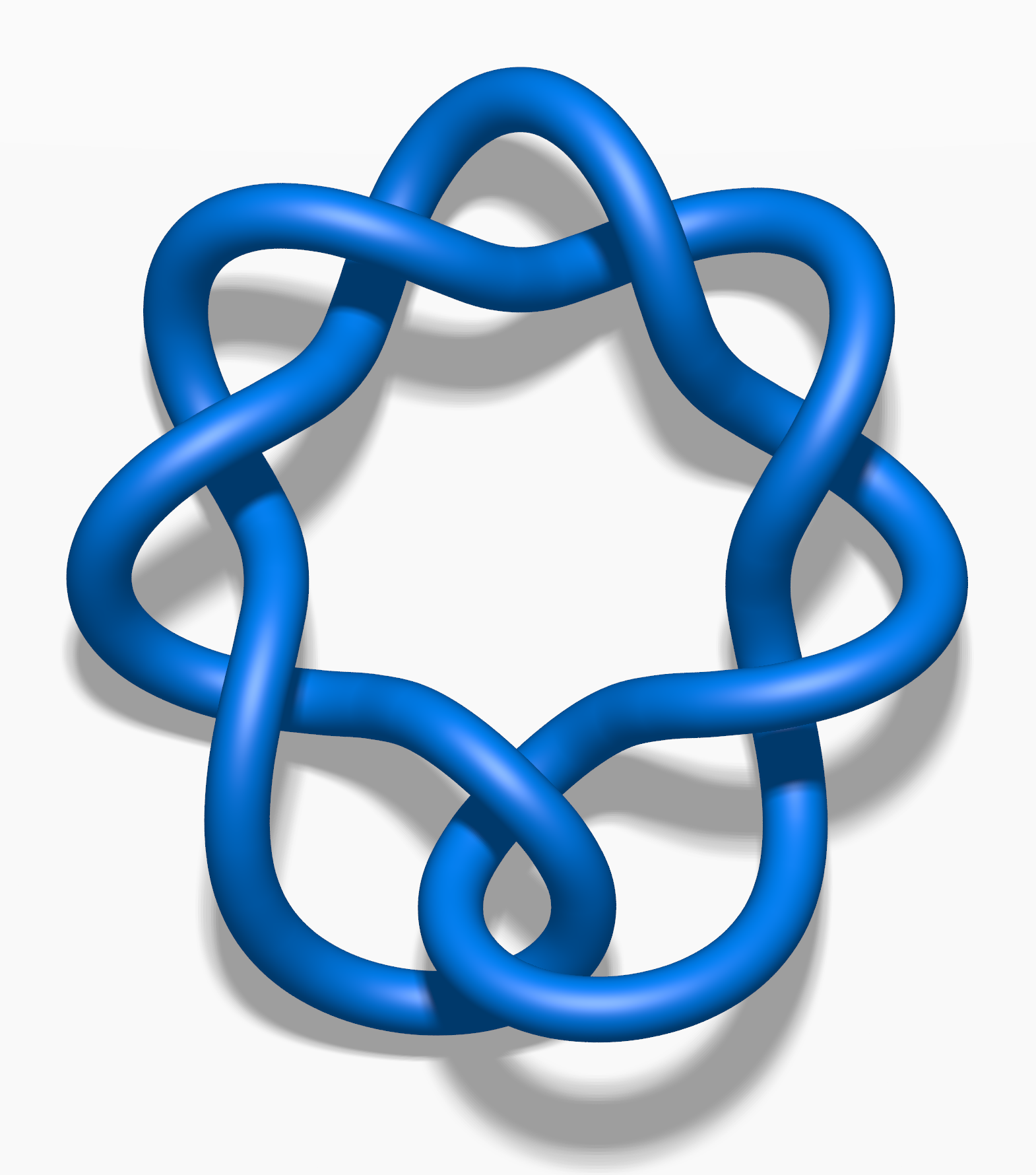
Six half-twists
(8_{1} knot)

== Properties ==
The four half-twist stevedore knot is created by passing the one end of an unknot with four half-twists through the other.

All twist knots have unknotting number one, since the knot can be untied by unlinking the two ends. Every twist knot is also a 2-bridge knot. Of the twist knots, only the unknot and the stevedore knot are slice knots. A twist knot with $n$ half-twists has crossing number $n+2$. All twist knots are invertible, but the only amphichiral twist knots are the unknot and the figure-eight knot.

== Invariants ==
The invariants of a twist knot depend on the number $n$ of half-twists. The Alexander polynomial of a twist knot is given by the formula

$$\Delta(t) = \begin{cases}
\frac{n+1}{2}t - n + \frac{n+1}{2}t^{-1} & \text{if }n\text{ is odd} \\
-\frac{n}{2}t + (n+1) - \frac{n}{2}t^{-1} & \text{if }n\text{ is even,} \\
\end{cases}$$

and the Conway polynomial is

$$\nabla(z) = \begin{cases}
\frac{n+1}{2}z^2 + 1 & \text{if }n\text{ is odd} \\
1 - \frac{n}{2}z^2 & \text{if }n\text{ is even.} \\
\end{cases}$$

When $n$ is odd, the Jones polynomial is

$$V(q) = \frac{1 + q^{-2} + q^{-n} - q^{-n-3}}{q+1},$$

and when $n$ is even, it is

$$V(q) = \frac{q^3 + q - q^{3-n} + q^{-n}}{q+1}.$$
