= Stuck unknot =

Type of closed polygonal chain

In mathematics, a stuck unknot is a closed polygonal chain in three-dimensional space (a skew polygon) that is topologically equal to the unknot but cannot be deformed to a simple polygon when interpreted as a mechanical linkage, by rigid length-preserving and non-self-intersecting motions of its segments. Similarly a stuck open chain is an open polygonal chain such that the segments may not be aligned by moving rigidly its segments. Topologically such a chain can be unknotted, but the limitation of using only rigid motions of the segments can create nontrivial knots in such a chain.

Consideration of such "stuck" configurations arises in the study of molecular chains in biochemistry.
