= Figure-eight knot (mathematics) =

Unique knot with a crossing number of four

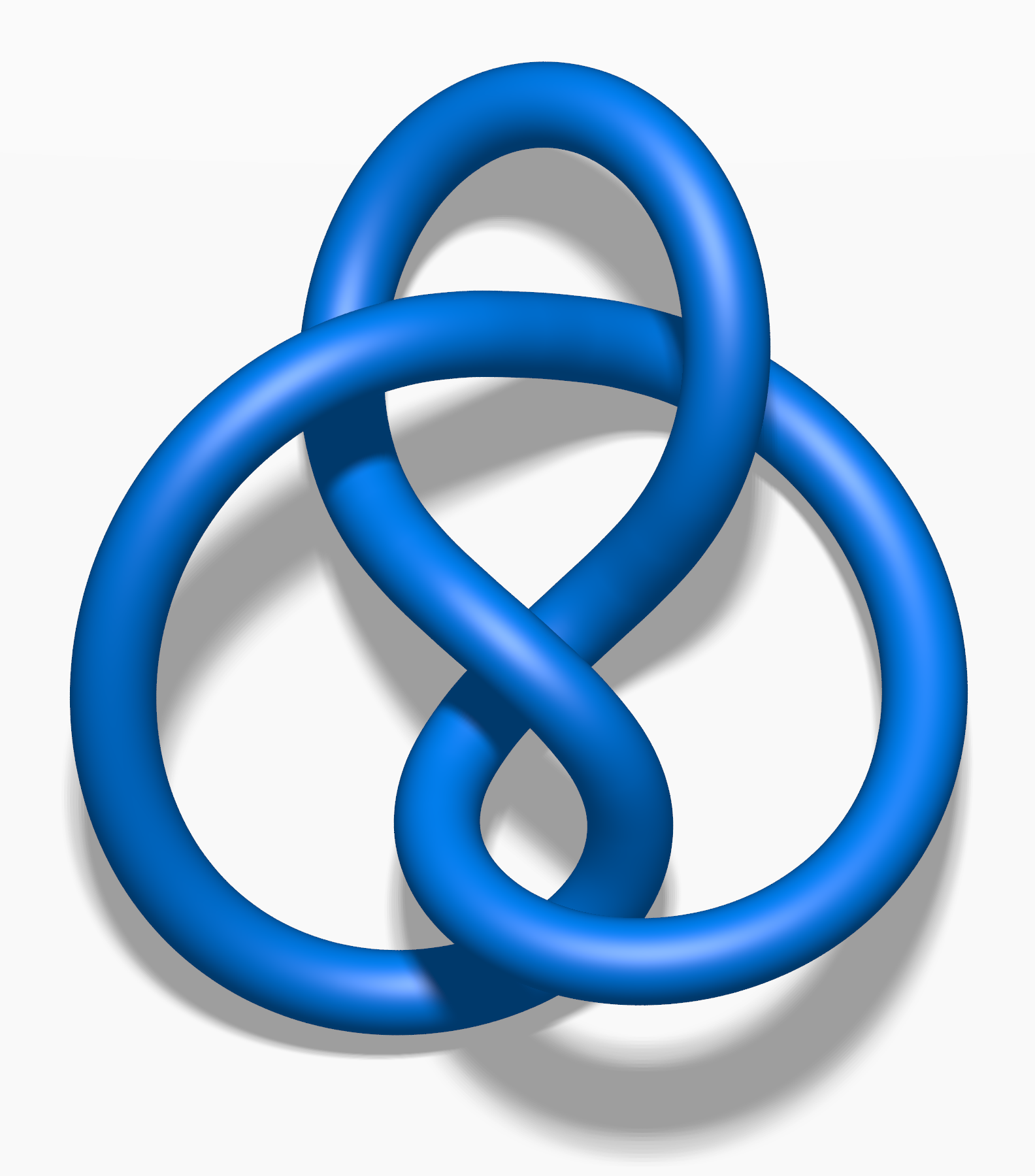
- Common name: Figure-eight knot
- Arf invariant: 1
- Braid length: 4
- Braid no.: 3
- Bridge no.: 2
- Crosscap no.: 2
- Crossing no.: 4
- Genus: 1
- Hyperbolic volume: 2.02988
- Stick no.: 7
- Unknotting no.: 1
- Conway notation: [22]
- A–B notation: 4_{1}
- Dowker notation: 4, 6, 8, 2
- Last / Next: 3_{1} / 5_{1}

Other
- alternating, hyperbolic, fibered, prime, fully amphichiral, twist

Figure-eight knot of practical knot-tying, with ends joined

In knot theory, a figure-eight knot (also called Listing's knot) is the unique knot with a crossing number of four. This makes it the knot with the third-smallest possible crossing number, after the unknot and the trefoil knot. The figure-eight knot is a prime knot.

== Origin of name ==
The name is given because tying a normal figure-eight knot in a rope and then joining the ends together, in the most natural way, gives a model of the mathematical knot.

== Description ==
A simple parametric representation of the figure-eight knot is as the set of all points (x,y,z) where

$$\begin{align}
x & = 2 \cos{(3t)} + \cos{(t)}, \\
y & = 2 \sin{(3t)} + \sin{(t)}, \\
z & = \sin{(4t)},
\end{align}$$

for t varying over the real numbers (see 2D visual realization at bottom right).

The figure-eight knot is prime, alternating, rational with an associated value of 5/3, and is achiral. The figure-eight knot is also a fibered knot. This follows from other, less simple (but very interesting) representations of the knot:

- It is a homogeneous (Note: A braid is called homogeneous if every generator $\sigma_i$ either occurs always with positive or always with negative sign.) closed braid (namely, the closure of the 3-string braid σ_{1}σ_{2}^{−1}σ_{1}σ_{2}^{−1}), and a theorem of John Stallings shows that any closed homogeneous braid is fibered.
- It is the link at (0,0,0,0) of an isolated critical point of a real-polynomial map F: R^{4}→R^{2}, so (according to a theorem of John Milnor) the Milnor map of F is actually a fibration. Bernard Perron found the first such F for this knot, namely,

$$F(x, y, z, t)=G(x, y, z^2-t^2, 2zt),\,\!$$

where

$$\begin{align}
G(x,y,z,t)=\ & (z(x^2+y^2+z^2+t^2)+x (6x^2-2y^2-2z^2-2t^2), \\
& \ t x \sqrt{2}+y (6x^2-2y^2-2z^2-2t^2)).
\end{align}$$

== Mathematical properties ==
The figure-eight knot has played an important role historically (and continues to do so) in the theory of 3-manifolds. Sometime in the mid-to-late 1970s, William Thurston showed that the figure-eight was hyperbolic, by decomposing its complement into two ideal hyperbolic tetrahedra. (Robert Riley and Troels Jørgensen, working independently of each other, had earlier shown that the figure-eight knot was hyperbolic by other means.) This construction, new at the time, led him to many powerful results and methods. For example, he was able to show that all but ten Dehn surgeries on the figure-eight knot resulted in non-Haken, non-Seifert-fibered irreducible 3-manifolds; these were the first such examples. Many more have been discovered by generalizing Thurston's construction to other knots and links.

The figure-eight knot is also the hyperbolic knot whose complement has the smallest possible volume, $6\Lambda(\pi/3) \approx 2.02988...$ (sequence A091518 in the OEIS), where $\Lambda$ is the Lobachevsky function. From this perspective, the figure-eight knot can be considered the simplest hyperbolic knot. The figure eight knot complement is a double-cover of the Gieseking manifold, which has the smallest volume among non-compact hyperbolic 3-manifolds.

The figure-eight knot and the (−2,3,7) pretzel knot are the only two hyperbolic knots known to have more than 6 exceptional surgeries, Dehn surgeries resulting in a non-hyperbolic 3-manifold; they have 10 and 7, respectively. A theorem of Lackenby and Meyerhoff, whose proof relies on the geometrization conjecture and computer assistance, holds that 10 is the largest possible number of exceptional surgeries of any hyperbolic knot. However, it is not currently known whether the figure-eight knot is the only one that achieves the bound of 10. A well-known conjecture is that the bound (except for the two knots mentioned) is 6.

Simple squared depiction of figure-eight configuration.

Symmetric depiction generated by parametric equations.

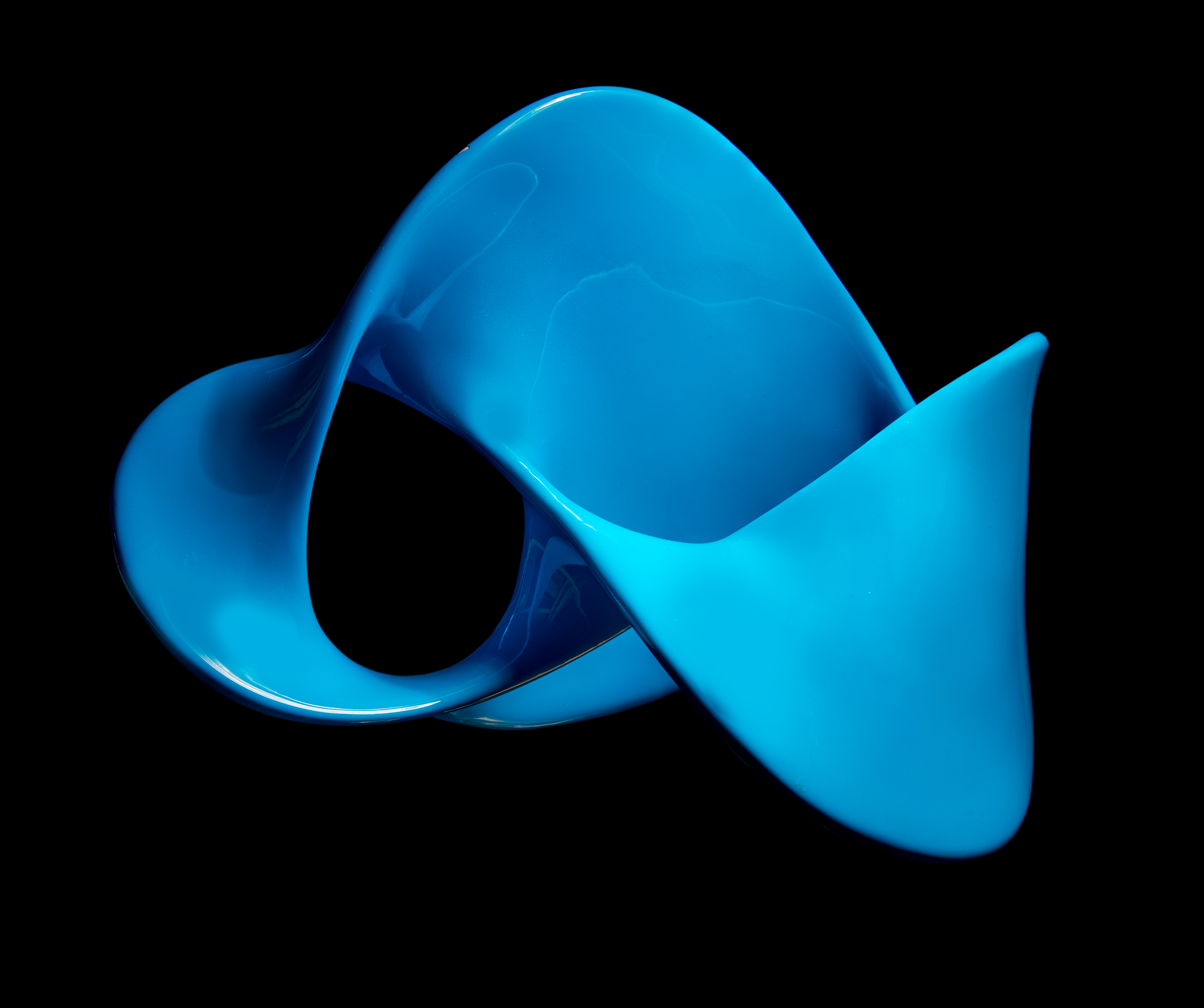
Mathematical surface Illustrating Figure-eight knot

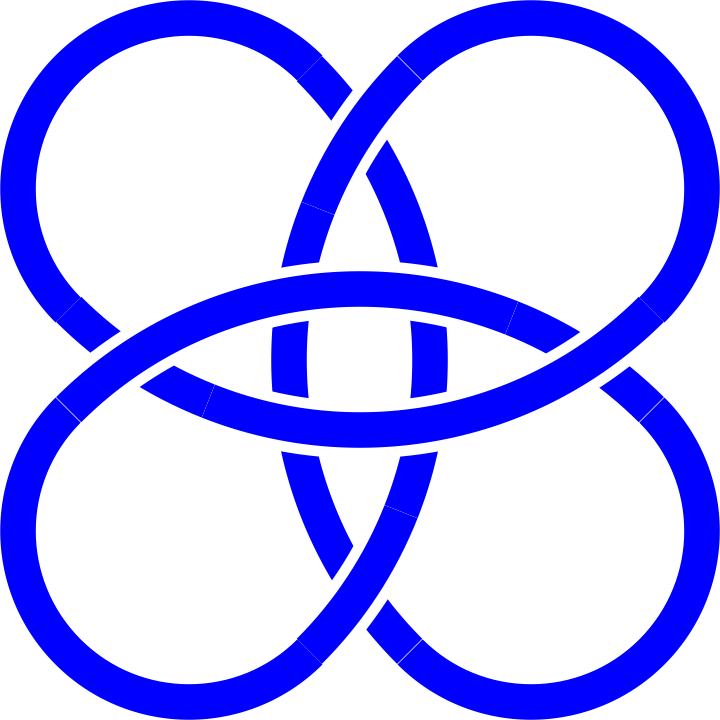
Non-minimal diagram of figure-eight knot showing the order-4 roto-reflection symmetry (reflect in the plane)

The figure-eight knot has genus 1 and is fibered. Therefore its complement fibers over the circle, the fibers being Seifert surfaces which are 2-dimensional tori with one boundary component. The monodromy map is then a homeomorphism of the 2-torus, which can be represented in this case by the matrix $(\begin{smallmatrix}2&1\\1&1\end{smallmatrix})$.

== Invariants ==
The Alexander polynomial of the figure-eight knot is

$$\Delta(t) = -t + 3 - t^{-1},\$$

since
$$\begin{pmatrix}1 & -1 \\ 0 & -1\end{pmatrix}$$
is a possible Seifert matrix, or because of its Conway polynomial, which is

$\nabla(z) = 1-z^2,\$

and the Jones polynomial is

$$V(q) = q^2 - q + 1 - q^{-1} + q^{-2}.\$$

The symmetry between $q$ and $q^{-1}$ in the Jones polynomial reflects the fact that the figure-eight knot is achiral.

Figure-eight knot
