= Torus knot =

Knot which lies on the surface of a torus in 3-dimensional space

the (2,−3)-torus knot, also known as the left-handed trefoil knot

(2,8) torus link with two components

In knot theory, a torus knot is a special kind of knot that lies on the surface of an unknotted torus in R^{3}. Similarly, a torus link is a link which lies on the surface of a torus in the same way. Each torus knot is specified by a pair of coprime integers p and q. A torus link arises if p and q are not coprime (in which case the number of components is gcd(p, q)). A torus knot is trivial (equivalent to the unknot) if and only if either p or q is equal to 1 or −1.

The simplest nontrivial example is the (2,3)-torus knot, also known as the trefoil knot.

== Geometrical representation ==
A torus knot can be rendered geometrically in multiple ways which are topologically equivalent (see Properties below) but geometrically distinct. The convention used in this article and its figures is the following.

The (p,q)-torus knot winds q times around a circle in the interior of the torus, and p times around its axis of rotational symmetry. (Note: Note that this use of the roles of p and q is contrary to what appears on. It is also inconsistent with the pictures that appear in:). If p and q are not relatively prime, then we have a torus link with more than one component.

The direction in which the strands of the knot wrap around the torus is also subject to differing conventions. The most common is to have the strands form a right-handed screw for p q > 0.

The (p,q)-torus knot can be given by the parametrization

$$\begin{align}
x &=  r\cos(p\phi) \\
y &=  r\sin(p\phi) \\
z &= -\sin(q\phi)
\end{align}$$

where $r = \cos(q\phi)+2$ and $0<\phi<2\pi$. This lies on the surface of the torus given by $(r-2)^2 + z^2 = 1$ (in cylindrical coordinates).

Other parameterizations are also possible, because knots are defined up to continuous deformation. The illustrations for the (2,3)- and (3,8)-torus knots can be obtained by taking $r = \cos(q\phi)+4$, and in the case of the (2,3)-torus knot by furthermore subtracting respectively $3\cos((p-q)\phi)$ and $3\sin((p-q)\phi)$ from the above parameterizations of x and y. The latter generalizes smoothly to any coprime p,q satisfying $p<q<2p$.

== Properties ==
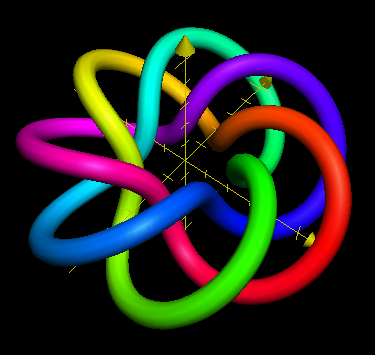
A (3,−7)-3D torus knot.

A torus knot is trivial if and only if either p or q is equal to 1 or −1.

Each nontrivial torus knot is prime and chiral.

The (p,q) torus knot is equivalent to the (q,p) torus knot. The (p,−q) torus knot is the obverse (mirror image) of the (p,q) torus knot. The (−p,−q) torus knot is equivalent to the (p,q) torus knot except for the reversed orientation.

The (3, 4) torus knot on the unwrapped torus surface, and its braid word

Any (p,q)-torus knot can be made from a closed braid with p strands. The appropriate braid word is

$$(\sigma_1\sigma_2\cdots\sigma_{p-1})^q.$$

(This formula assumes the common convention that braid generators are right twists, which is not followed by the Wikipedia page on braids.)

The crossing number of a (p,q) torus knot with p,q > 0 is given by

c = min((p−1)q, (q−1)p).

The genus of a torus knot with p,q > 0 is

$$g = \frac{1}{2}(p-1)(q-1).$$

The Alexander polynomial of a torus knot is

$t^k\frac{(t^{pq}-1)(t-1)}{(t^p-1)(t^q-1)},$ where $k=-\frac{(p-1)(q-1)}{2}.$

The Jones polynomial of a (right-handed) torus knot is given by

$$t^{(p-1)(q-1)/2}\frac{1-t^{p+1}-t^{q+1}+t^{p+q}}{1-t^2}.$$

The complement of a torus knot in the 3-sphere is a Seifert-fibered manifold, fibred over the disc with two singular fibres.

Let Y be the p-fold dunce cap with a disk removed from the interior, Z be the q-fold dunce cap with a disk removed from its interior, and X be the quotient space obtained by identifying Y and Z along their boundary circle. The knot complement of the (p, q) -torus knot deformation retracts to the space X. Therefore, the knot group of a torus knot has the presentation

$$\langle x,y \mid x^p = y^q\rangle.$$

Torus knots are the only knots whose knot groups have nontrivial center (which is infinite cyclic, generated by the element $x^p = y^q$ in the presentation above).

The stretch factor of the (p,q) torus knot, as a curve in Euclidean space, is Ω(min(p,q)), so torus knots have unbounded stretch factors. Undergraduate researcher John Pardon won the 2012 Morgan Prize for his research proving this result, which solved a problem originally posed by Mikhail Gromov.

== Connection to complex hypersurfaces ==
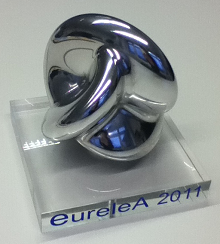
EureleA Award showing a (2,3)-torus knot.

The (p,q)−torus knots arise when considering the link of an isolated complex hypersurface singularity. One intersects the complex hypersurface with a hypersphere, centred at the isolated singular point, and with sufficiently small radius so that it does not enclose, nor encounter, any other singular points. The intersection gives a submanifold of the hypersphere.

Let p and q be coprime integers, greater than or equal to two. Consider the holomorphic function $f: \Complex^2 \to \Complex$ given by $f(w,z) := w^p + z^q.$ Let $V_f \subset \Complex^2$ be the set of $(w,z) \in \Complex^2$ such that $f(w,z) = 0.$ Given a real number $0 < \varepsilon \ll 1,$ we define the real three-sphere $\mathbb{S}^3_{\varepsilon} \subset \R^4 \hookrightarrow \Complex^2$ as given by $|w|^2 + |z|^2 = \varepsilon^2.$ The function $f$ has an isolated critical point at $(0,0) \in \Complex^2$ since $\partial f/\partial w = \partial f/ \partial z = 0$ if and only if $w = z = 0.$ Thus, we consider the structure of $V_f$ close to $(0,0) \in \Complex^2.$ In order to do this, we consider the intersection $V_f \cap \mathbb{S}^3_{\varepsilon} \subset \mathbb{S}^3_{\varepsilon}.$ This intersection is the so-called link of the singularity $f(w,z) = w^p + z^q.$ The link of $f(w,z) = w^p + z^q$, where p and q are coprime, and both greater than or equal to two, is exactly the (p,q)−torus knot.

== List ==
- Unknot, 3_{1} knot (3,2), 5_{1} knot (5,2), 7_{1} knot (7,2), 8_{19} knot (4,3), 9_{1} knot (9,2), 10_{124} knot (5,3)

Table #	A-B	Image	P	Q	Cross #
0	0_{1}		1	0	0
3a1	3_{1}		2	3	3
5a2	5_{1}		2	5	5
7a7	7_{1}		2	7	7
8n3	8_{19}		3	4	8
9a41	9_{1}		2	9	9
10n21	10_{124}		3	5	10
11a367			2	11	11
13a4878			2	13	13
14n21881			3	7	14
15n41185			4	5	15
15a85263			2	15	15
16n783154			3	8	16
			2	17	17
			2	19	19
			3	10	20
			4	7	21
			2	21	21
			3	11	22
			2	23	23
			5	6	24
			2	25	25
			3	13	26
			4	9	27
			2	27	27
			5	7	28
			3	14	28
			2	29	29
			2	31	31
			5	8	32
			3	16	32
			4	11	33
			2	33	33
			3	17	34
			6	7	35
			2	35	35
			5	9	36
			7	8	48
			7	9	54
			8	9	63

== g-torus knot ==
A g-torus knot is a closed curve drawn on a g-torus. More technically, it is the homeomorphic image of a circle in S³ which can be realized as a subset of a genus g handlebody in S³ (whose complement is also a genus g handlebody). If a link is a subset of a genus two handlebody, it is a double torus link.

For genus two, the simplest example of a double torus knot that is not a torus knot is the figure-eight knot.

== See also ==
- Alternating knot
- Hyperbolic knot
- Irrational winding of a torus
- Satellite knot
