= Fibered knot =

Mathematical knot

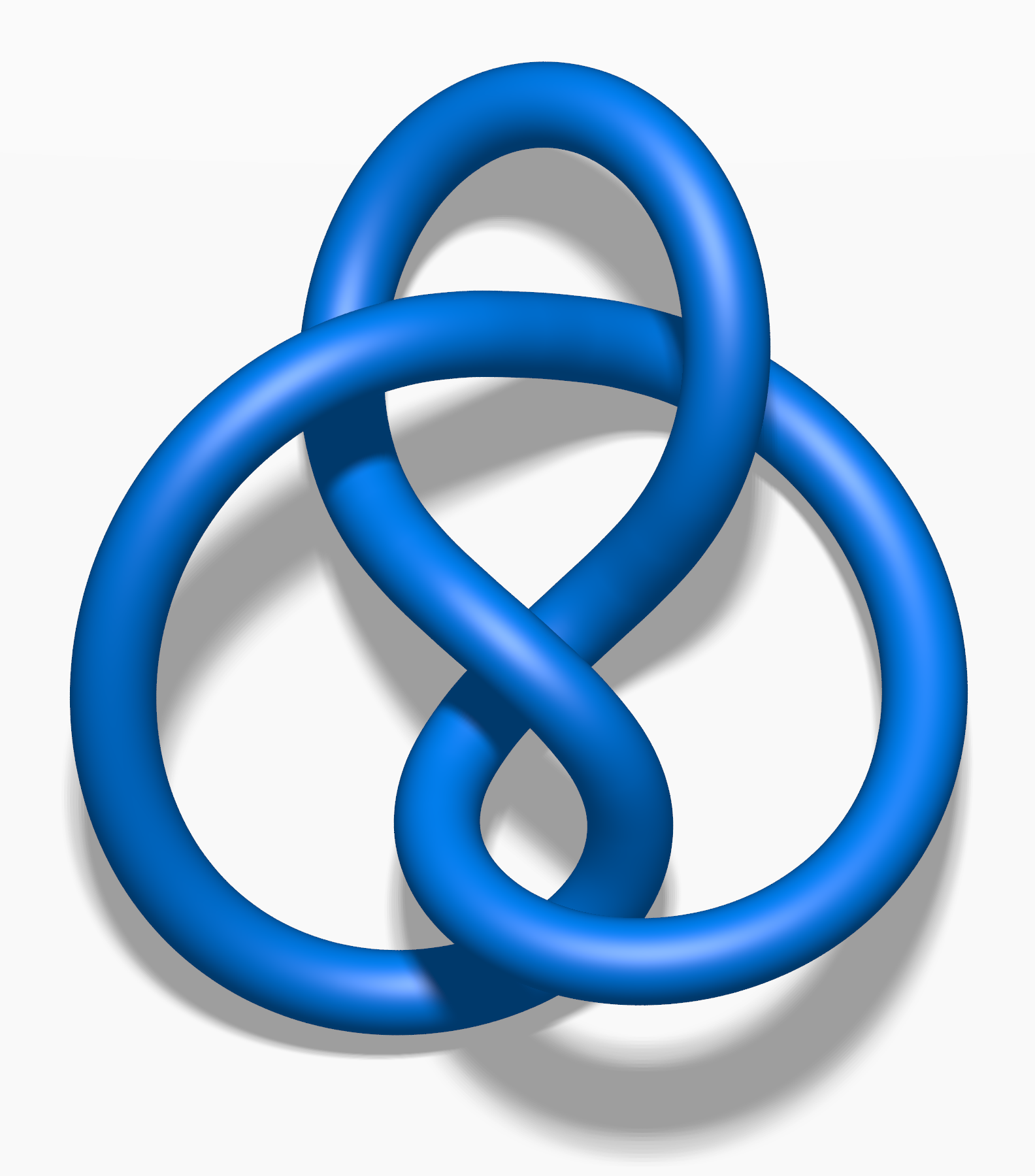
Figure-eight knot is fibered.

In knot theory, a branch of mathematics, a knot or link $K$ in the 3-dimensional sphere $S^3$ is called fibered or fibred (sometimes Neuwirth knot in older texts, after Lee Neuwirth) if there is a 1-parameter family $F_t$ of Seifert surfaces for $K$, where the parameter $t$ runs through the points of the unit circle $S^1$, such that if $s$ is not equal to $t$ then the intersection of $F_s$ and $F_t$ is exactly $K$.

== Examples ==
=== Knots that are fibered ===
For example:

- The unknot, trefoil knot, and figure-eight knot are fibered knots.
- The Hopf link is a fibered link.

=== Knots that are not fibered ===
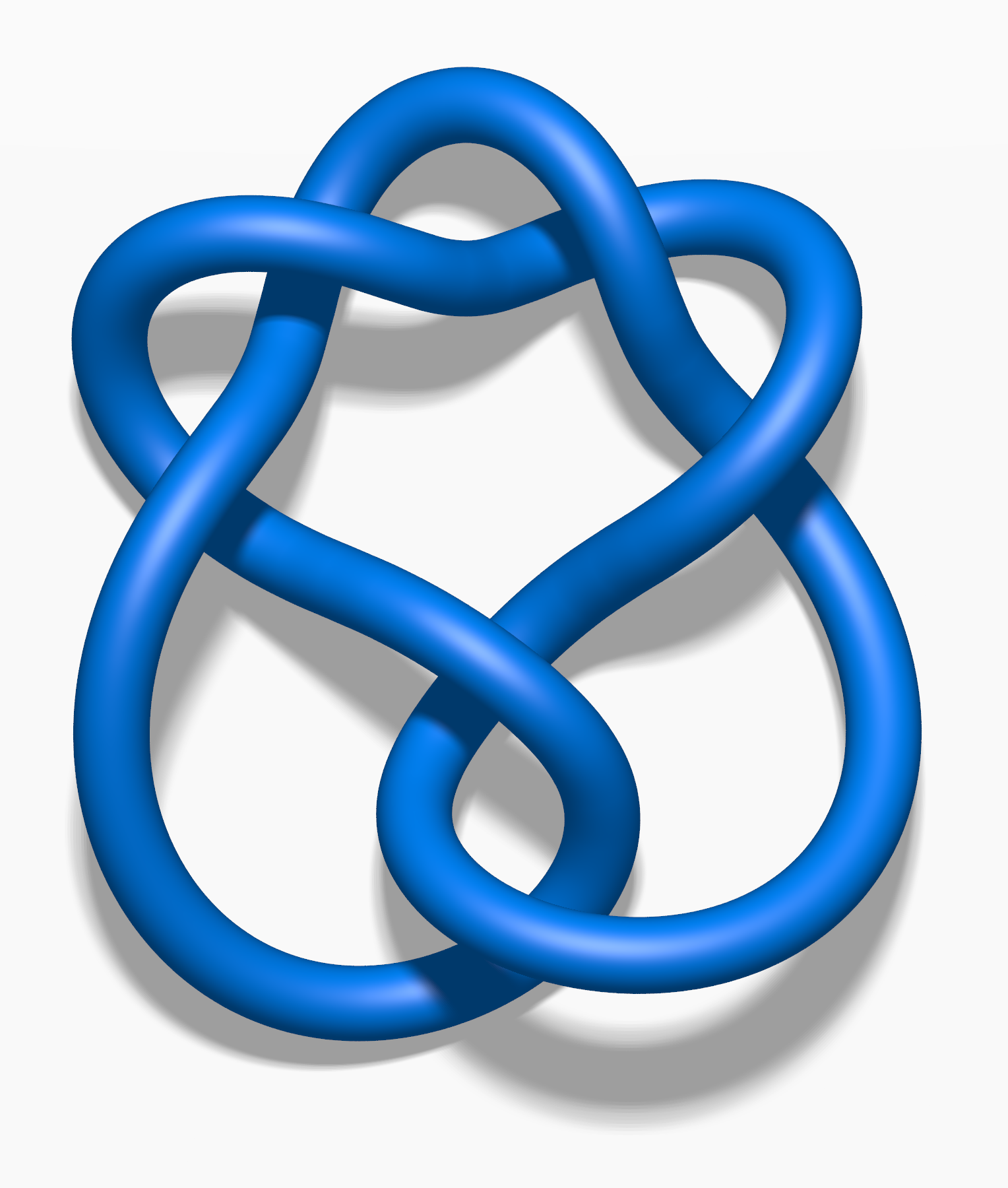
The stevedore knot is not fibered

The Alexander polynomial of a fibered knot is monic, i.e. the coefficients of the highest and lowest powers of t are plus or minus 1. Examples of knots with nonmonic Alexander polynomials abound, for example the twist knots have Alexander polynomials $qt-(2q+1)+qt^{-1}$, where q is the number of half-twists. In particular the stevedore knot is not fibered.

== Related constructions ==
Fibered knots and links arise naturally, but not exclusively, in complex algebraic geometry. For instance, each singular point of a complex plane curve can be described topologically as the cone on a fibered knot or link called the link of the singularity. The trefoil knot is the link of the cusp singularity $z^2+w^3$; the Hopf link (oriented correctly) is the link of the node singularity $z^2+w^2$. In these cases, the family of Seifert surfaces is an aspect of the Milnor fibration of the singularity.

A knot is fibered if and only if it is the binding of some open book decomposition of $S^3$.

== See also ==
- (−2,3,7) pretzel knot
