= Invertible knot =

In mathematics, especially in the area of topology known as knot theory, an invertible knot is a knot that can be continuously deformed to itself, but with its orientation reversed. A non-invertible knot is any knot which does not have this property. The invertibility of a knot is a knot invariant. An invertible link is the link equivalent of an invertible knot.

There are only five knot symmetry types, indicated by chirality and invertibility: fully chiral, reversible, positively amphichiral noninvertible, negatively amphichiral noninvertible, and fully amphichiral invertible.

== Background ==
Number of invertible and non-invertible knots for each crossing number
| Number of crossings | 3 | 4 | 5 | 6 | 7 | 8 | 9 | 10 | 11 | 12 | 13 | 14 | 15 | 16 | OEIS sequence |
|---|---|---|---|---|---|---|---|---|---|---|---|---|---|---|---|
| Non-invertible knots | 0 | 0 | 0 | 0 | 0 | 1 | 2 | 33 | 187 | 1144 | 6919 | 38118 | 226581 | 1309875 | A052403 |
| Invertible knots | 1 | 1 | 2 | 3 | 7 | 20 | 47 | 132 | 365 | 1032 | 3069 | 8854 | 26712 | 78830 | A052402 |

It has long been known that most of the simple knots, such as the trefoil knot and the figure-eight knot are invertible. In 1962 Ralph Fox conjectured that some knots were non-invertible, but it was not proved that non-invertible knots exist until Hale Trotter discovered an infinite family of pretzel knots that were non-invertible in 1963. It is now known almost all knots are non-invertible.

== Invertible knots ==
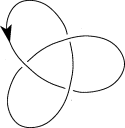
The simplest non-trivial invertible knot, the trefoil knot. Rotating the knot 180 degrees in 3-space about an axis in the plane of the diagram produces the same knot diagram, but with the arrow's direction reversed.

All knots with crossing number of 7 or less are known to be invertible. No general method is known that can distinguish if a given knot is invertible. The problem can be translated into algebraic terms, but unfortunately there is no known algorithm to solve this algebraic problem.

If a knot is invertible and amphichiral, it is fully amphichiral. The simplest knot with this property is the figure eight knot. A chiral knot that is invertible is classified as a reversible knot.

=== Strongly invertible knots ===
A more abstract way to define an invertible knot is to say there is an orientation-preserving homeomorphism of the 3-sphere which takes the knot to itself but reverses the orientation along the knot. By imposing the stronger condition that the homeomorphism also be an involution, i.e. have period 2 in the homeomorphism group of the 3-sphere, we arrive at the definition of a strongly invertible knot. All knots with tunnel number one, such as the trefoil knot and figure-eight knot, are strongly invertible.

== Non-invertible knots ==
The non-invertible knot 8_{17}, the simplest of the non-invertible knots.

The simplest example of a non-invertible knot is the knot 8_{17} (Alexander-Briggs notation) or .2.2 (Conway notation). The pretzel knot 7, 5, 3 is non-invertible, as are all pretzel knots of the form (2p + 1), (2q + 1), (2r + 1), where p, q, and r are distinct integers, which is the infinite family proven to be non-invertible by Trotter.

== See also ==
- Chiral knot
