= Unknot =

Loop seen as a trivial knot

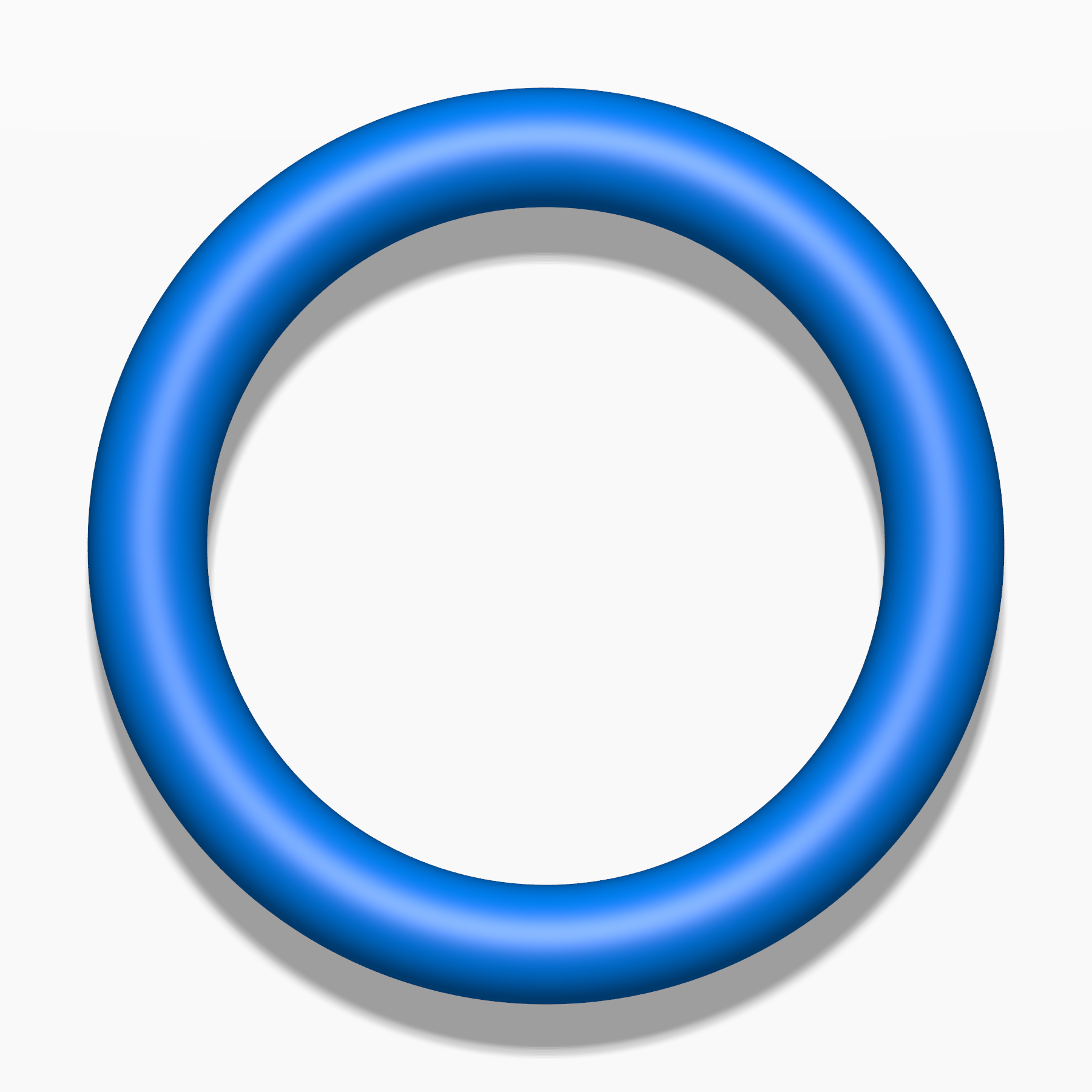
- Common name: Circle
- Arf invariant: 0
- Braid no.: 1
- Bridge no.: 0
- Crossing no.: 0
- Genus: 0
- Linking no.: 0
- Stick no.: 3
- Tunnel no.: 0
- Unknotting no.: 0
- Conway notation: -
- A–B notation: 0_{1}
- Dowker notation: -
- Next: 3_{1}

Other
- torus, fibered, prime, slice, fully amphichiral

Two simple diagrams of the unknot

In the mathematical theory of knots, the unknot, not knot, or trivial knot, is the least knotted of all knots. Intuitively, the unknot is a closed loop of rope without a knot tied into it, unknotted. To a knot theorist, an unknot is any embedded topological circle in the 3-sphere that is ambient isotopic (that is, deformable) to a geometrically round circle, the standard unknot.

The unknot is the only knot that is the boundary of an embedded disk, which gives the characterization that only unknots have Seifert genus 0. Similarly, the unknot is the identity element with respect to the knot sum operation.

== Background ==
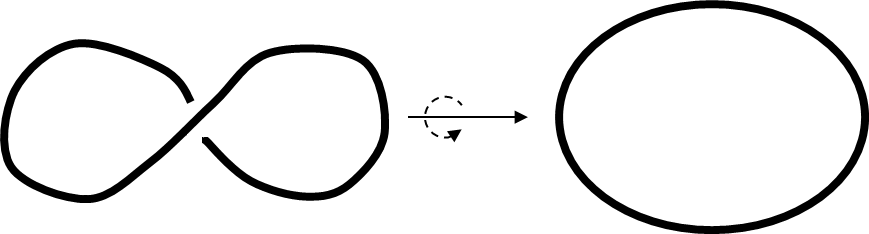
An easy unknot, reduced to a trivial diagram by a type I Reidemeister move.

An unknot is a closed loop in three dimensions that does not contain knots and can, in principle, be stretched out into a circle without any part of the loop passing through another part. A diagram of an unknot is a projection of its three dimensional shape onto two dimensions, where the loop can appear to cross over itself. At each crossing where two parts of the curve intersect, the diagram will show which part of the curve passes over or under the other. To demonstrate whether any given diagram is an unknot, a sequence of Reidemeister moves must be applied to the diagram to eliminate all the crossings until the diagram is a circle, known as simplifying the diagram. This typically involve passing parts of the diagram over each other (Reidemeister types II and III), or untwisting loops (type I). While an individual diagram may be simplified in a small number of Reidemeister moves, it is very difficult to know how many moves this will take for an arbitrary diagram.

== Unknotting problem ==
Deciding if a particular knot is the unknot was a major driving force behind knot invariants, since it was thought this approach would possibly give an efficient algorithm to recognize the unknot from some presentation such as a knot diagram. Unknot recognition is known to be in both NP and co-NP.

It is known that knot Floer homology and Khovanov homology detect the unknot, but these are not known to be efficiently computable for this purpose. It is not known whether the Jones polynomial or finite type invariants can detect the unknot.

== Examples ==
It can be difficult to find a way to untangle string even though the fact it started out untangled proves the task is possible. Thistlethwaite and Ochiai provided many examples of diagrams of unknots that have no obvious way to simplify them, requiring one to temporarily increase the diagram's crossing number. Such cases are known as hard unknots.

Thistlethwaite unknot

One of Ochiai's unknots

While rope is generally not in the form of a closed loop, sometimes there is a canonical way to imagine the ends being joined together. From this point of view, many useful practical knots are actually the unknot, including those that can be tied in a bight.

Every tame knot can be represented as a linkage, which is a collection of rigid line segments connected by universal joints at their endpoints. The stick number is the minimal number of segments needed to represent a knot as a linkage, and a stuck unknot is a particular unknotted linkage that cannot be reconfigured into a flat convex polygon. Like crossing number, a linkage might need to be made more complex by subdividing its segments before it can be simplified.

== Hard unknot ==
A hard unknot is a diagram of the unknot for which proving that it is unknotted is difficult. Hard unknot diagrams typically have at least ten crossings, and the difficulty arises both from the human perception of knottedness as well as from the number of Reidemeister moves required to reduce the diagram to that of a circle. Typically, a hard unknot diagram requires additional crossings to be introduced before the number of crossings can be reduced to zero. These diagrams are of importance to the field of knot theory because they can serve as cases for which conjectures about unknotting algorithms can be tested.

=== Examples ===
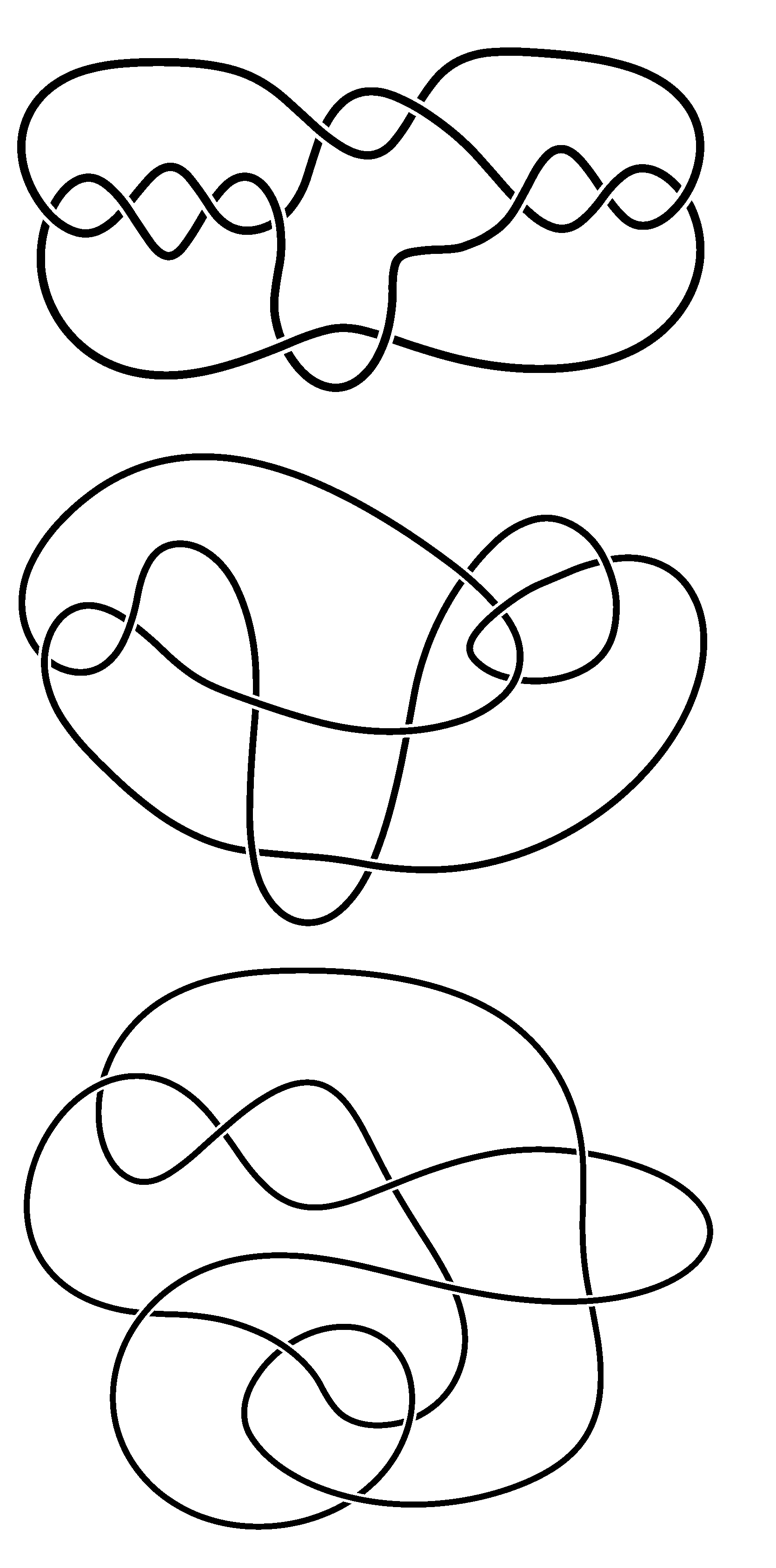
From top to bottom, the Goeritz, Culprit, and Monster unknots

Early examples of hard unknot diagrams were created by Lebrecht Goeritz in 1934. A diagram known as the Goeritz unknot contains 11 crossings but requires an additional crossing to be created in order to simplify it. Another early diagram is known as "the Culprit" and was created by Ken Millett in 1988. It contains 10 crossings. At least two additional crossings must be introduced, making the diagram reach at least 12 crossings, before the knot can be untied using planar Reidemeister moves. (Note, however, only one new crossing needs to be introduced when working with spherical Reidemeister moves.) Many other examples exist such as "the Monster" created by Rob Scharein, who used a physics engine to show that hard unknots could be simplified. A 2025 computational study found 2.6 million cases of hard unknot diagrams that could not be simplified by available algorithms, but were determined to be unknotted through the calculation of knot invariants.

== Invariants ==
The Alexander–Conway polynomial and Jones polynomial of the unknot are trivial:
$$\Delta(t) = 1,\quad \nabla(z) = 1,\quad V(q) = 1.$$

No other knot with 10 or fewer crossings has trivial Alexander polynomial, but the Kinoshita–Terasaka knot and Conway knot (both of which have 11 crossings) have the same Alexander and Conway polynomials as the unknot. It is an open problem whether any non-trivial knot has the same Jones polynomial as the unknot.

The unknot is the only knot whose knot group is an infinite cyclic group, and its knot complement is homeomorphic to a solid torus.

== Unknotting on a sphere ==
If a diagram lies on the surface of a sphere rather than a plane, unknotting can be simpler as part of the diagram may (for example) slide over the North Pole, pass over the equator, and be brought up from the South Pole. In the case of both the Goeritz unknot and the Culprit, only one extra crossing (rather than two) is required on a sphere, and the Monster no longer requires additional crossings. In 2021, it was demonstrated that no previously published example of a hard unknot requires more than one additional crossing on a sphere. Computational methods were used to create new hard unknot diagrams that require at least three additional crossings, on either a sphere or a plane, currently the hardest known unknots.

== See also ==
- Knot (mathematics) – Embedding of the circle in three dimensional Euclidean space
- Unknotting number – Minimum number of times a specific knot must be passed through itself to become untied
- Unlink – Link that consists of finitely many unlinked unknots
