= Crosscap number =

In the mathematical field of knot theory, the crosscap number of a knot K is the minimum of

$$C(K) \equiv 1 - \chi(S), \,$$

taken over all compact, connected, non-orientable surfaces S bounding K; here $\chi$ is the Euler characteristic. The crosscap number of the unknot is zero, as the Euler characteristic of the disk is one.

== Knot sum ==
The crosscap number of a knot sum is bounded:

$$C(k_1) + C(k_2) - 1 \leq C(k_1 \mathbin{\#} k_2) \leq C(k_1) + C(k_2).\,$$

== Examples ==
- The crosscap number of the trefoil knot is 1, as it bounds a Möbius strip and is not trivial.
- The crosscap number of a torus knot was determined by M. Teragaito.
