= Prime knot =

Non-trivial knot which cannot be written as the knot sum of two non-trivial knots

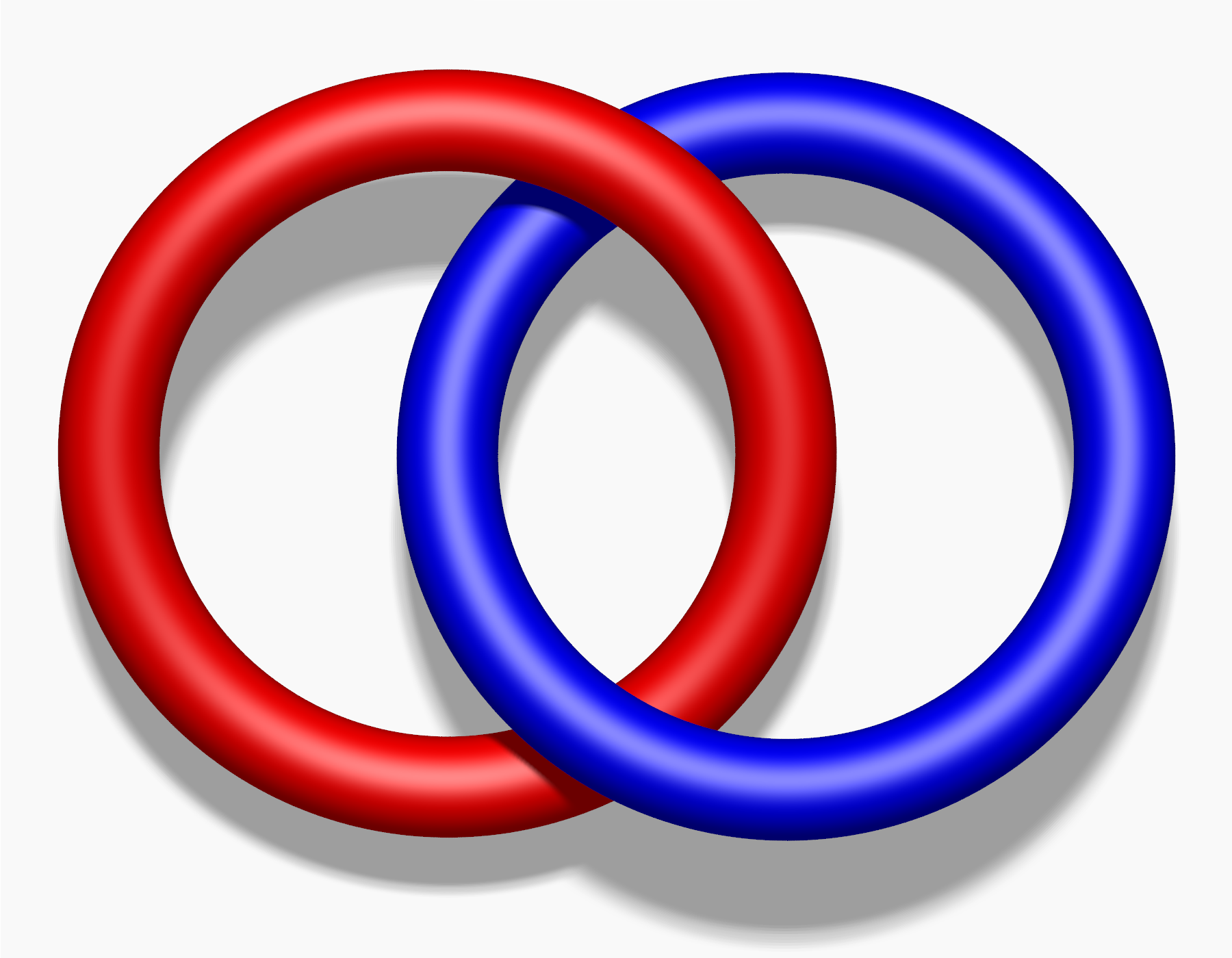
Simplest prime link

In knot theory, a prime knot or prime link is a knot that is, in a certain sense, indecomposable. Specifically, it is a non-trivial knot which cannot be written as the knot sum of two non-trivial knots. Knots that are not prime are said to be composite knots or composite links. It can be a nontrivial problem to determine whether a given knot is prime or not.

A family of examples of prime knots are the torus knots. These are formed by wrapping a circle around a torus p times in one direction and q times in the other, where p and q are coprime integers.

Knots are characterized by their crossing numbers. The simplest prime knot is the trefoil with three crossings. The trefoil is actually a (2, 3)-torus knot. The figure-eight knot, with four crossings, is the simplest non-torus knot. For any positive integer n, there are a finite number of prime knots with n crossings. The first few values for exclusively prime knots (sequence A002863 in the OEIS) and for prime or composite knots (sequence A086825 in the OEIS) are given in the following table. As of June 2025, prime knots up to 20 crossings have been fully tabulated.

| n | 1 | 2 | 3 | 4 | 5 | 6 | 7 | 8 | 9 | 10 | 11 | 12 | 13 | 14 | 15 | 16 | 17 | 18 | 19 | 20 |
| Number of prime knots with n crossings | 0 | 0 | 1 | 1 | 2 | 3 | 7 | 21 | 49 | 165 | 552 | 2176 | 9988 | 46972 | 253293 | 1388705 | 8053393 | 48266466 | 294130458 | 1847319428 |
| Composite knots | 0 | 0 | 0 | 0 | 0 | 2 | 1 | 5 | ... | | ... | | ... | | ... | | ... | | ... | |
| Total | 0 | 0 | 1 | 1 | 2 | 5 | 8 | 26 | ... | | ... | | ... | | ... | | ... | | ... | |

Enantiomorphs are counted only once in this table and the following chart (i.e. a knot and its mirror image are considered equivalent).

A chart of all prime knots with seven or fewer crossings, not including mirror-images, plus the unknot (which is not considered prime).

== Schubert's theorem ==
A theorem due to Horst Schubert (1919–2001) states that every knot can be uniquely expressed as a connected sum of prime knots.

== See also ==
- List of prime knots
