= Bridge number =

A trefoil knot, drawn with bridge number 2

In the mathematical field of knot theory, the bridge number, also called the bridge index, is an invariant of a knot defined as the minimal number of bridges required in all the possible bridge representations of a knot.

== Definition ==
Given a knot or link, draw a diagram of the link using the convention that a gap in the line denotes an undercrossing. Call an unbroken arc in this diagram a bridge if it includes at least one overcrossing. Then the bridge number of a knot can be found as the minimum number of bridges required for any diagram of the knot. Bridge numbers were first studied in the 1950s by Horst Schubert.

The bridge number can equivalently be defined geometrically instead of topologically. In bridge representation, a knot lies entirely in the plane apart for a finite number of bridges whose projections onto the plane are straight lines. Equivalently, the bridge number is the minimal number of local maxima of the projection of the knot onto a vector, where we minimize over all projections and over all conformations of the knot. In this context, the bridge number is often called the crookedness.

== Properties ==
Every non-trivial knot has bridge number at least two, so the knots that minimize the bridge number (other than the unknot) are the 2-bridge knots. It can be shown that every n-bridge knot can be decomposed into two trivial n-tangles and hence 2-bridge knots are rational knots.

If K is the connected sum of K_{1} and K_{2}, then the bridge number of K is one less than the sum of the bridge numbers of K_{1} and K_{2}.

== Other numerical invariants ==
- Crossing number
- Linking number
- Stick number
- Unknotting number
