= De'Broski R. Herbert =

American immunologist

De'Broski. R. Herbert
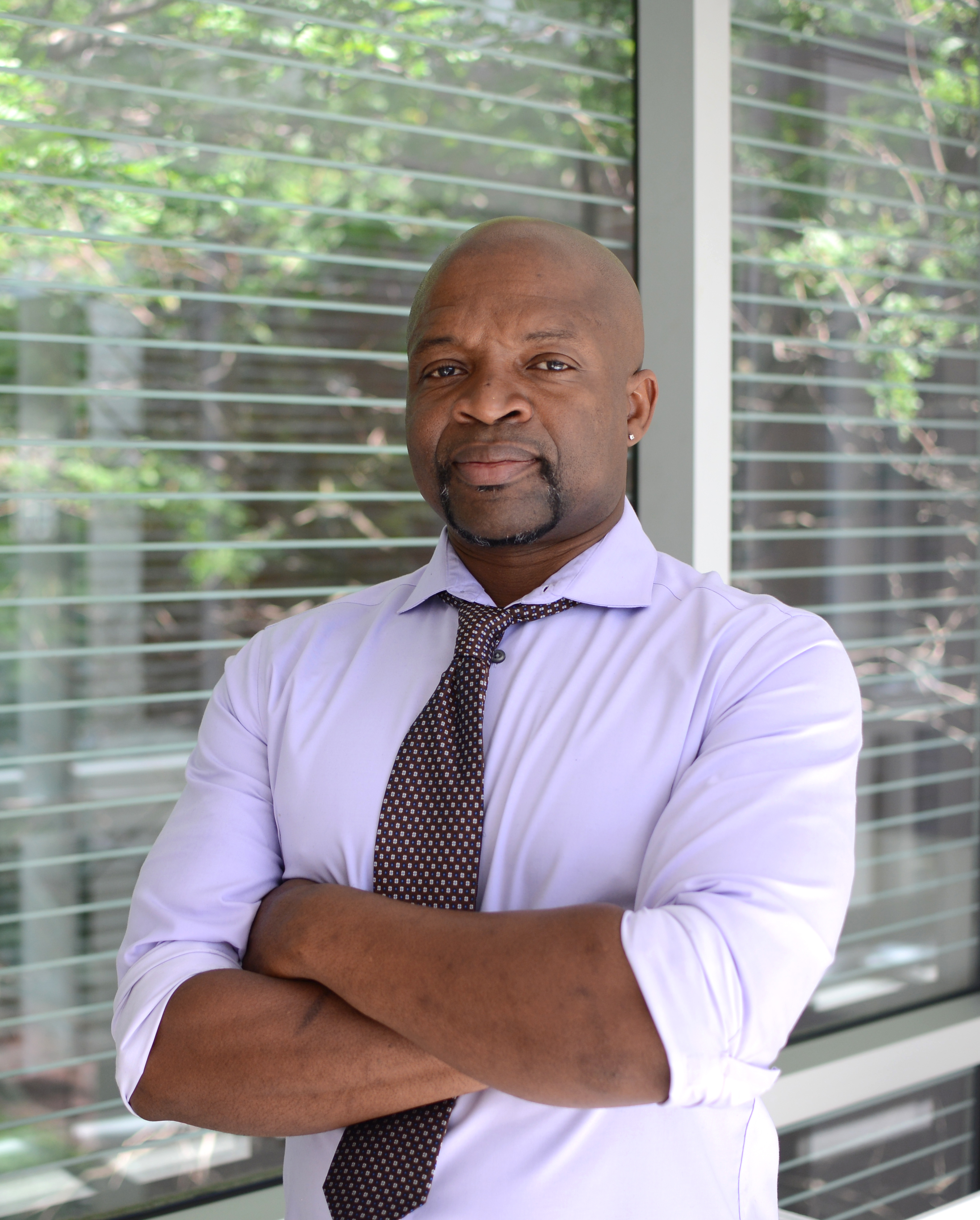
- Occupations: Immunologist, Parasitologist, Academic, and Biomedical research scientist
- Awards: Burroughs Wellcome Award Investigators in the Pathogenesis of Infectious Disease (PATH); Vanguard Award Lecturer, American Association of Immunologists; Distinguished Alumni Award, Thomas Jefferson University; Penn Presidential Professorship

Academic background
- Education: B.S., Microbiology; Ph.D., Immunology
- Alma mater: Xavier University of Louisiana; Thomas Jefferson University

Academic work
- Institutions: University of Pennsylvania, School of Veterinary Medicine; University of Cape Town, South Africa (2001-2006); University of Cincinnati (2006-2009); Cincinnati Children’s Hospital Medical Center (2009-2012); University of California, San Francisco (2012-2016)

De’Broski. R. Herbert is an immunologist, parasitologist, academic, and biomedical researcher. He ẁas appointed professor of immunology in 2021, and Penn Presidential Professor at the University of Pennsylvania School of Veterinary Medicine. He is also the associate director for Institute of Infectious and Zoonotic Disease (PennVet), and an affiliated Scientist at the Monell Chemical Senses Center.

Herbert has contributed to the fields of mucosal immunology, intestinal and pulmonary inflammation and host defense against different parasite species using both human and mouse systems. His scientific interests focus on exploring the regulatory networks that control immunity, inflammation and tissue repair at the mucosal interface.

== Education ==
Herbert graduated with a Bachelors of Science degree from Xavier University of Louisiana in 1994 with a major in Microbiology and a minor in Chemistry. He later enrolled at Thomas Jefferson University in Philadelphia, and earned a Doctoral degree in Immunology in 2000, under the supervision of parasitologist David Abraham. Following this, conducted postdoctoral research in Infectious Immunology at the University of Cape Town in Cape Town, South Africa under the mentorship of Frank Brombacher of the Max Planck Institute in Freiburg, Germany.

== Career ==
Herbert formally began his academic career upon returning to the U.S. as a research instructor in the Department of Medicine at the University of Cincinnati in 2006. He was then promoted to research assistant professor in 2008 and then was an assistant professor at Cincinnati Children's Research Foundation from 2009 till 2012. He was recruited to the Division of Experimental Medicine at the University of California at San Francisco as an assistant professor in the department of Medicine at the San Francisco General Hospital in 2012. Herbert was promoted to associate professor of medicine in 2015. Following this appointment, he decided to join the faculty at the University of Pennsylvania in 2016 as an associate professor of immunology. In 2021, he was named Penn Presidential Professor at the University of Pennsylvania School of Veterinary Medicine, and associate director of the PennVet Institute for Infectious and Zoonotic Disease (IIZD).

Herbert is member of American Association of Immunologists, Society of Mucosal Immunology, American Thoracic Society, and International Cytokine and Interferon Society.

Herbert is the director of education and international affairs in the newly formed UPenn Institute for Innovation in Infectious Disease (IIZD).

== Research ==
Herbert has authored over 63 publications. His research uses a combination of murine, veterinary animal, and human model systems to demonstrate parasite-host interactions, mucosal immunology, and regenerative medicine.

=== Cellular immunology ===
Herbert's work regarding cellular immunology is mainly focused on understanding the cross-talk between the immune system and the epithelial cells lining the airway. He has highlighted the significance of alternative macrophage activation for survival during schistosomiasis and downmodulates T helper 1 responses and immunopathology. In 2018, he gave insights on how tissue macrophages and other hematopoietic cells use metabolic and reparative pathways to shape the outcome of lung injury. Together with Noam Cohen, he performed a study to determine whether the solitary chemosensory cell (SCC) is the predominant source of IL-25 in the sinonasal epithelium. Results of the study highlighted that the patients with CRSwNP have increased numbers of SCCs in nasal polyp tissue and that in vitro IL-13 exposure both increased proliferation and induced apical secretion of IL-25 into the mucosal layer. While examining the relationship between SCCs and ILC2s in CRSwN, they found out that solitary chemosensory cells prone to produce interleukin-25 and group-2 innate lymphoid cells are enriched in chronic rhinosinusitis with nasal polyps.

=== Immunology of infectious diseases ===
Herbert has worked on the study of parasitic helminths (worms). He has made contributions to the understanding of how the alternatively activated macrophage (M2) phenotype serves to protect against helminth-infection. In 2021, he presented a review on the major inventions in the immunology of helminth infection made over the last decade, ranging from innate lymphoid cells to the emerging importance of neuroimmune connections. Moreover, his studies tend to cover the status of human challenge trials with helminths as treatment for autoimmune diseases.

Herbert also contributed to a study led by Carla Rothlin at Yale that aimed to determine the role that genetic ablation of a receptor tyrosine kinase encoded byTyro3in mice or the functional neutralization of its ortholog in human dendritic cells, serves to play in terms of enhancing type 2 immunity. Moreover, it was indicated that the TAM family receptor tyrosine kinase TYRO3 is a 'negative regulator' of type 2 immunity. Additional research centered on discussing the implications of AMP-activated protein kinase (AMPK), highlights that myeloid-restricted AMPKα1 tends to promote host immunity and restrict IL-12/23p40-dependent lung injury resulted from hookworm infection.

Some of Herbert's research is focused on determining the role served by intestinal epithelial cells in the process of worm expulsion through producing immunoregulatory cytokines and bioactive mediators that interfere with parasite chemosensory locomotion. A 2013 research study demonstrated the applications of IL-33 in the context of driving primary and anamnestic immunity against the rodent hookworm Nippostrongylus brasiliensis. While maintaining a balance between resistance and susceptibility in this model system, he explored and highlighted novel themes in innate and adaptive immunity, immunomodulation, and regulation of responsiveness in helminth infection. In a later study, led by Nicole Maloney Belle, the Herbert lab pursued the importance of Trefoil factor proteins in the reparative functions of intestinal epithelial cells (IEC) in nutrient absorption, regeneration, and mucus secretion. That study provided data describing an analysis of how TFF3 interacts with a novel binding receptor leucine rich repeat and nogo interacting protein 2 (LINGO2 in order to regulate EGFR activation for protection against gastrointestinal helminthes.

=== Trefoil factor biology ===
Herbert has made contributions to understanding if and how Trefoils modulate immune cell function in the context of infectious and non-infectious injury. His research group has produced advances towards understanding how Trefoil factors modulate Type 2 and Type 1 immune responses. In a 2012 research study conducted on mice, they demonstrated the implications of TFF2 (trefoil factor 2), an epithelial cell-derived repair molecule, in terms of controlling lung injury caused by the hookworm parasite Nippostrongylus brasiliensis and for type 2 immunity after infection. His studies demonstrated that lung macrophages rely upon Trefoil factor 2 to promote epithelial proliferation following damage caused by sterile wounding, Nippostrongylus brasiliensis or Bleomycin sulfate. With co-workers he has identified a receptor for TFF3 in the LINGO family of receptors; LINGO2 polymorphisms have been implicated in human asthma. In his study focused on defining the role of macrophages in terms of promoting epithelial proliferation following infectious and non-infectious lung injury, he highlighted how lung macrophages rely upon Trefoil factor 2 to promote epithelial proliferation following damage caused by sterile wounding, Nippostrongylus brasiliensis or Bleomycin sulfate.

== Awards and honors ==
- 2014 - Burroughs Wellcome Award Investigators in the Pathogenesis of Infectious Disease (PATH)
- 2014 - Keystone Symposia Scientific Advisory Board Member
- 2015 - UCSF Alumni Weekend Discovery fellow
- 2016 - Institute for Immunology Inflammation Program leader
- 2016 - Mucosal Immunology Studies Team (MIST) Project leader
- 2018 - NIH-WALS lecturer
- 2021 - Vanguard Award Lecturer, American Association of Immunologists
- 2021 - Distinguished Alumni Award, Thomas Jefferson University
- 2021 - Penn Presidential Associate Professorship
- 2021 - Keynote speaker for Immunodiverse colloquia

== Bibliography ==
- De'Broski, R. H., Hölscher, C., Mohrs, M., Arendse, B., Schwegmann, A., Radwanska, M., ... & Brombacher, F. (2004). Alternative macrophage activation is essential for survival during schistosomiasis and downmodulates T helper 1 responses and immunopathology. Immunity, 20(5), 623-635.
- Wills-Karp, M., Rani, R., Dienger, K., Lewkowich, I., Fox, J. G., Perkins, C., ... & Herbert, D. B. R. (2012). Trefoil factor 2 rapidly induces interleukin 33 to promote type 2 immunity during allergic asthma and hookworm infection. Journal of Experimental Medicine, 209(3), 607-622.
- Macrophages promote epithelial proliferation following infectious and non-infectious lung injury through a Trefoil factor 2-dependent mechanism. Hung, L.Y., Sen, D., Oniskey, T.K., Katzen, J., Cohen NA, Vaughan AE, Nieves W, Urisman A, Beers MF, Krummel MF, Herbert DR. Mucosal Immunol. 2019 Jan;12(1):64-76. doi: 10.1038/s41385-018-0096-2. PMID 30337651
- Hung, L. Y., Tanaka, Y., Herbine, K., Pastore, C., Singh, B., Ferguson, A., ... & Herbert, D. B. R. (2020). Cellular context of IL-33 expression dictates impact on anti-helminth immunity. Science immunology, 5(53), eabc6259.
- Douglas, B., Wei, Y., Li, X., Ferguson, A., Hung, L. Y., Pastore, C., ... & Herbert, D. B. R. (2021). Transgenic expression of a T cell epitope in Strongyloides ratti reveals that helminth-specific CD4+ T cells constitute both Th2 and Treg populations. PLoS pathogens, 17(7), e1009709.
