= Trefoil =

Artistic representation of three circular leaf shapes used in architecture

Architectural trefoil

A trefoil (ultimately from Latin trifolium 'three-leaved plant', via Old French trifoil) is a graphic form composed of the outline of three overlapping rings, used in architecture, Pagan and Christian symbolism, among other areas. The term is also applied to other symbols with a threefold shape. A similar shape with four rings is called a quatrefoil.

== Architecture ==
=== Ornamentation ===
'Trefoil' is a term in Gothic architecture given to the ornamental foliation or cusping introduced in the heads of window-lights, tracery, and panellings, in which the centre takes the form of a three-lobed leaf (formed from three partially overlapping circles). One of the earliest examples is in the plate tracery at Winchester Cathedral (1222–1235). The fourfold version of an architectural trefoil is a quatrefoil.

A simple trefoil shape in itself can be symbolic of the Trinity, while a trefoil combined with an equilateral triangle was also a moderately common symbol of the Christian Trinity during the late Middle Ages in some parts of Europe, similar to a barbed quatrefoil. Two forms of a trefoil combined with a triangle are shown below:

Outlined

Interlaced

A dove, which symbolizes the Holy Spirit, is sometimes depicted within the outlined form of the trefoil combined with a triangle.

=== Architectural layout ===
In architecture and archaeology, a 'trefoil' describes a layout or floor plan consisting of three apses in clover-leaf shape, as for example in the Megalithic temples of Malta.

Particularly in church architecture, such a layout may be called a "triconchos".

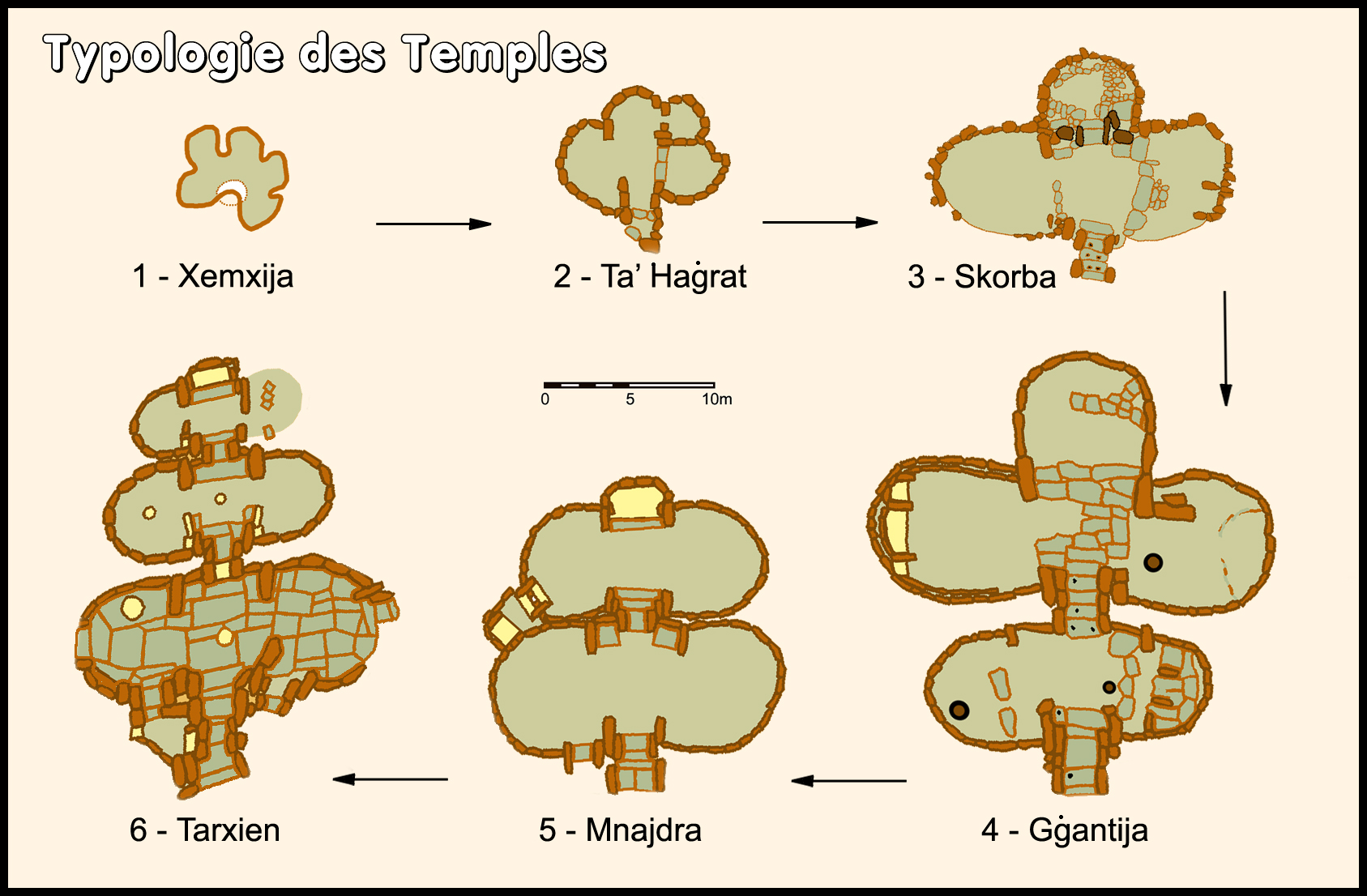
Evolution of layout of Maltese Megalithic temples; Skorba (upper right) has a typical trefoil plan

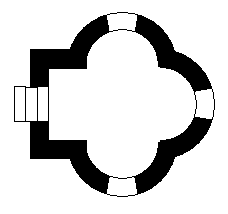
A typical triconchos

== Heraldry ==
The heraldic 'trefoil' is a stylized clover. It should not be confused with the figure named in French heraldry tiercefeuille ("threefoil"), which is a stylized flower with three petals, and differs from the heraldic trefoil in being not slipped. (Note: The French terms 'quartefeuille' and 'quintefeuille' are translated as 'quatrefoils' and 'cinquefoils'.)

Trefoil in heraldry

Or a fess sable between three trefoils vert

Gules a cross flory argent between four tiercefeuilles Or

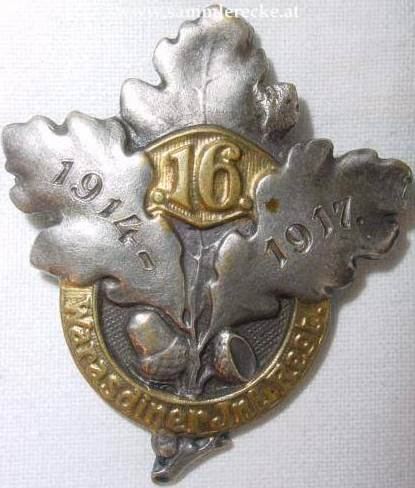
Croatian trefoil badge worn by Royal Croatian Home Guard during Austria-Hungary, depicting oak leaves

Croatian trefoil used by the Axis-sympathetic Croatian Air Force Legion in World War II, formed from a defaced Balkenkreuz

== Symbols ==
Symmetrical trefoils are particularly popular as warning and informational symbols. If a box containing hazardous material is moved around and shifted into different positions, it is still easy to recognize the symbol, while the distinctive trefoil design of the recycling symbol makes it easy for a consumer to notice and identify the packaging the symbol has been printed on as recyclable. Easily stenciled symbols are also favored.

Ionizing radiation hazard trefoil

Fallout shelter trefoil

Biological hazard trefoil

Universal recycling symbol

VORTAC Aircraft Navigation Beacon

One particular stylized form of the heraldic trefoil is used as the main element in the logo of most Girl Guiding and Girl Scouting organizations. For Girl Scouts, the three trefoil leaves represent the three-fold promise: "To serve God and my country, to help people at all times, and to live by the Girl Scout law."

While the green trefoil is considered by many to be the symbol of Ireland, the harp has much greater officially recognized status. Therefore, shamrocks generally do not appear on Irish coins or postage stamps.

A trefoil is also part of the logo for Adidas Originals, which also includes three stripes.

== See also ==
- Clover or Trefoil, a plant
- Fleur-de-Lys
- Foil (architecture)
- Hidden Mickey
- Quatrefoil
- Shamrock
- Trefoil arch
- Trefoil domain
- Trefoil knot
- Torus knot
