= Trefoil factor 3 =

Protein-coding gene in the species Homo sapiens

TFF3
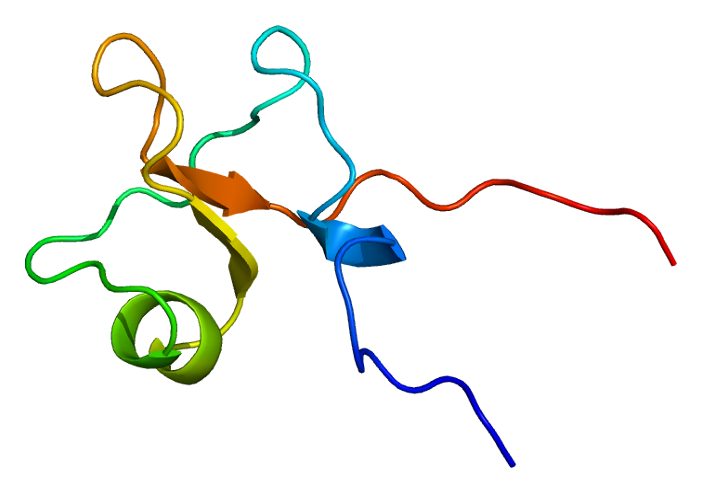
Available structures
PDB	Ortholog search: PDBe RCSB
PDB	List of PDB id codes 1E9T, 1PE3

Identifiers
- Aliases: TFF3, ITF, P1B, TFI, trefoil factor 3
- External IDs: OMIM: 600633; MGI: 104638; HomoloGene: 2427; GeneCards: TFF3; OMA:TFF3 - orthologs

Gene location (Human)
Chr.	Chromosome 21 (human)
Band	21q22.3	Start	42,311,667 bp
Band	21q22.3	End	42,315,409 bp

Gene location (Mouse)
Chr.	Chromosome 17 (mouse)
Band	17 A3.3|17 15.8 cM	Start	31,344,280 bp
Band	17 A3.3|17 15.8 cM	End	31,348,620 bp
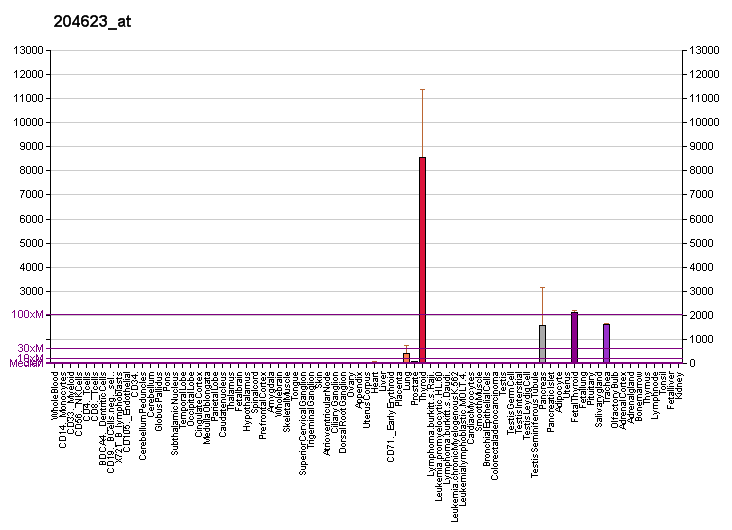
RNA expression pattern
Bgee	Human / Mouse (ortholog); Top expressed in: mucosa of transverse colon; mucosa of ileum; left lobe of thyroid gland; pancreatic ductal cell; right lobe of thyroid gland; rectum; mucosa of sigmoid colon; right uterine tube; olfactory zone of nasal mucosa; trachea / Top expressed in: crypt of lieberkuhn of small intestine; ileum; left colon; duodenum; intestinal villus; epithelium of small intestine; Paneth cell; Ileal epithelium; migratory enteric neural crest cell; jejunum; More reference expression data
BioGPS	More reference expression data
Gene ontology
Molecular function	protein binding; molecular function
Cellular component	cytoplasm; extracellular space; extracellular region; secretory granule
Biological process	wound healing; regulation of glucose metabolic process; maintenance of gastrointestinal epithelium
Sources:Amigo / QuickGO
Orthologs
Species	Human	Mouse
Entrez	7033	21786
Ensembl	ENSG00000160180	ENSMUSG00000024029
UniProt	Q07654	Q62395
RefSeq (mRNA)	NM_003226	NM_011575
RefSeq (protein)	NP_003217	NP_035705
Location (UCSC)	Chr 21: 42.31 – 42.32 Mb	Chr 17: 31.34 – 31.35 Mb
PubMed search
- Wikidata
View/Edit Human	View/Edit Mouse

Trefoil factor 3 is a protein that in humans is encoded by the TFF3 gene.

== Function ==
Members of the trefoil family are characterized by having at least one copy of the trefoil motif, a 40-amino acid domain that contains three conserved disulfide bonds. They are stable secretory proteins expressed in gastrointestinal mucosa. Their functions are diverse, including protection of the mucosa, thickening of the mucus, and increasing epithelial healing rates. This gene is a marker of columnar epithelium and is expressed in a variety of tissues including goblet cells of the intestines and colon. This gene and two other related trefoil family member genes are found in a cluster on chromosome 21.

=== Glycan binding ===
All three human trefoil factors are lectins that interact specifically with the disaccharide GlcNAc-α-1,4-Gal. This disaccharide is an unusual glycotope that is only known to exist on the large, heavily glycosylated, mucins in the mucosa. By cross-linking mucins through the bivalent binding of this glycotope, the trefoil factors are then able to reversible modulate the thickness and viscosity of the mucus.

=== In breast milk ===
Trefoil factors (TFF) are secretory products of mucin producing cells. They play a key role in the maintenance of the surface integrity of oral mucosa and enhance healing of the gastrointestinal mucosa by a process called restitution. TFF comprises the gastric peptides (TFF1), spasmolytic peptide (TFF2), and the intestinal trefoil factor (TFF3, this protein). They have an important and necessary role in epithelial restitution within the gastrointestinal tract. Significant amounts of TFF are present in human milk. Evidence has been presented that TFF3 isolated from milk strongly correlates with downregulation of IL-6 and IL-8 in human intestinal epithelial cells. On the other hand, TFF3 activated the epithelial cells in culture to produce beta-defensin 2 (hBD2) and beta defensins 4 (hBD4). These findings suggest that TFF can activate intestinal epithelial cells and could actively participate in the immune system of breastfed babies by inducing the production of peptides related to innate defence, such as defensins.

=== Activation of PAR-2 receptors ===
Two main mechanisms have been described for the activation of PAR-2: (A) by specific cleavage that unmask the receptor-activating peptide sequence present in the extracellular N-terminal domain of each PAR, leading to cell signaling via interaction of the exposed tethered ligand with the body of the receptor itself; and (B) by synthetic peptides, such as SLIGKV, that bind to the receptor, mimicking the actions of agonist proteases. During lactation, TFF3 secreted in human milk may activate intestinal epithelial cells through PAR-2 receptors, which in turn induces hBD2 and hBD4 expression and cytokine regulation.

== Clinical significance ==
Using TFF3 as a marker of columnar epithelium, a process using an ingestible oesophageal sampling device (Cytosponge) coupled with immunocytochemistry for trefoil factor 3 to improve the accuracy and acceptability of the detection/screening of Barrett's oesophagus has been developed. However the clinical utility of such a test may be limited by frequent staining of TFF3 in gastric cardia and subsequent risk of false positives.
