= Michael D. L. Johnson =

Michael Johnson
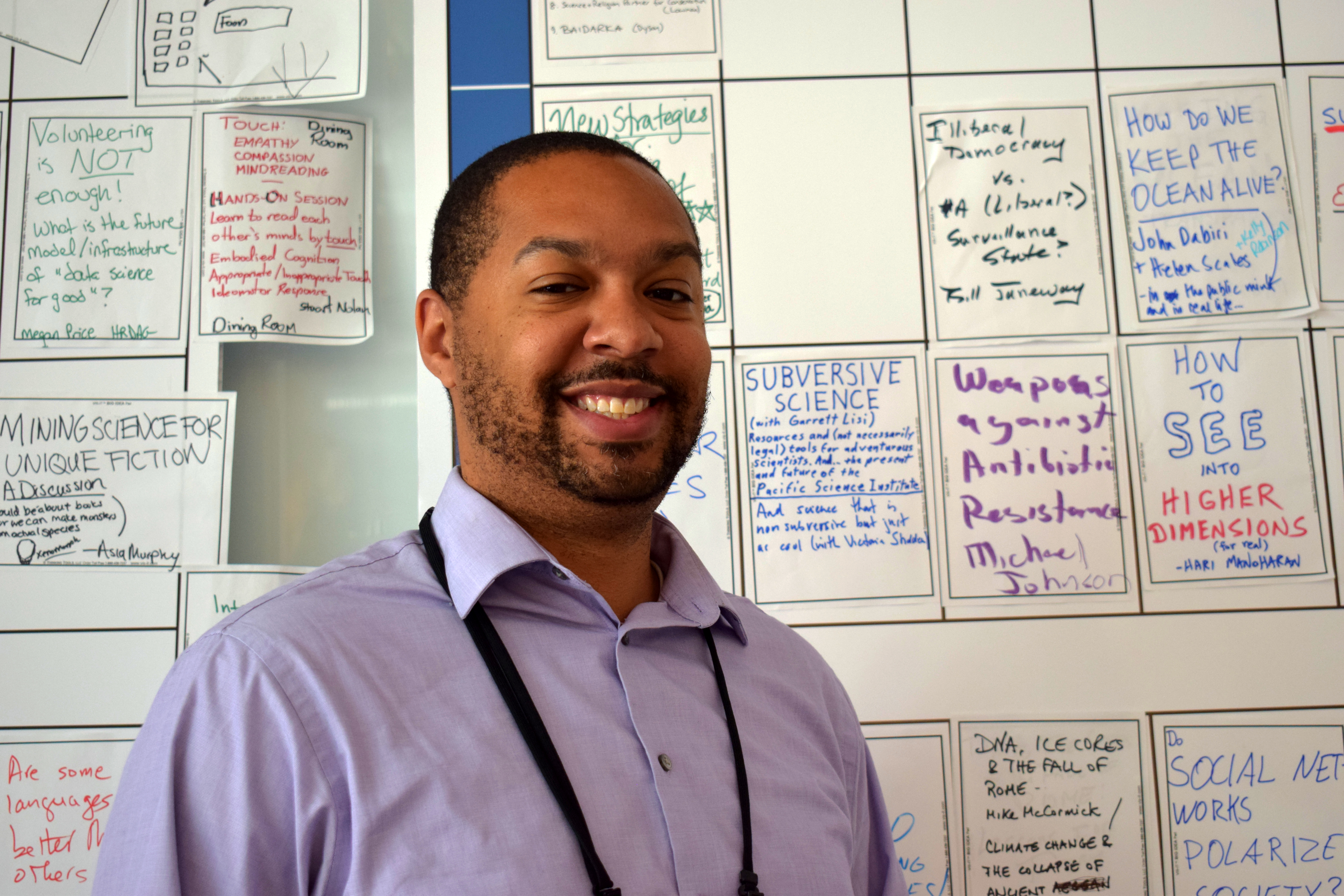
- Born: 1982 (age 43–44); Chicago, Illinois
- Education: Bachelor’s of Art in Music,Duke University, 2004. PhD in Biochemistry and Biophysics, University of North Carolina at Chapel Hill, 2011.
- Employer: Arizona State University
- Title: Dr
- Spouse: Elisha Johnson
- Children: 2

Michael D. L. Johnson is a biologist, bacteriologist, and an associate professor of immunobiology at the University of Arizona. Johnson is the co-founder of the National Summer Undergraduate Research Project (NSURP) a program that matched underrepresented students whose career opportunities were impacted by COVID-19 with mentors nationwide. Johnson works on the usage of copper metal to fight viruses like COVID-19 and also harmful bacteria. He is also a Keystone Symposia Fellow.

== Early life and education ==
Johnson graduated from Whitney Young Magnet High School in 2000. In 2004, Johnson moved to North Carolina to study veterinary medicine at Duke University where he graduated with a bachelor’s of art in music.

In 2006, Johnson redirected his academic focus to pharmacology, where, as a research technician, he worked at the University of North Carolina at Chapel Hill (UNC) Frelinger laboratory until the end of that summer. He was accepted as a doctoral candidate at UNC and pursued a PhD in biochemistry and biophysics, where he earned his degree in 2011. For his dissertation, Johnson researched bacterial responses to calcium.

In January 2012, he began his post fellowship at St. Jude Children's Hospital where he was a doctoral research associate.

== Career ==
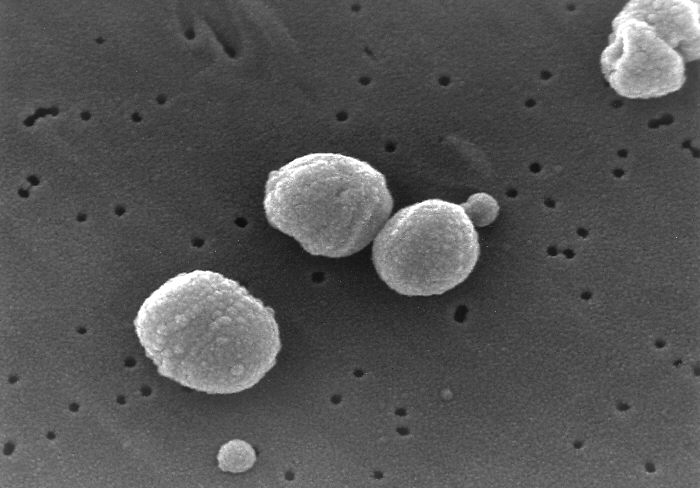
Streptococcus pneumoniae

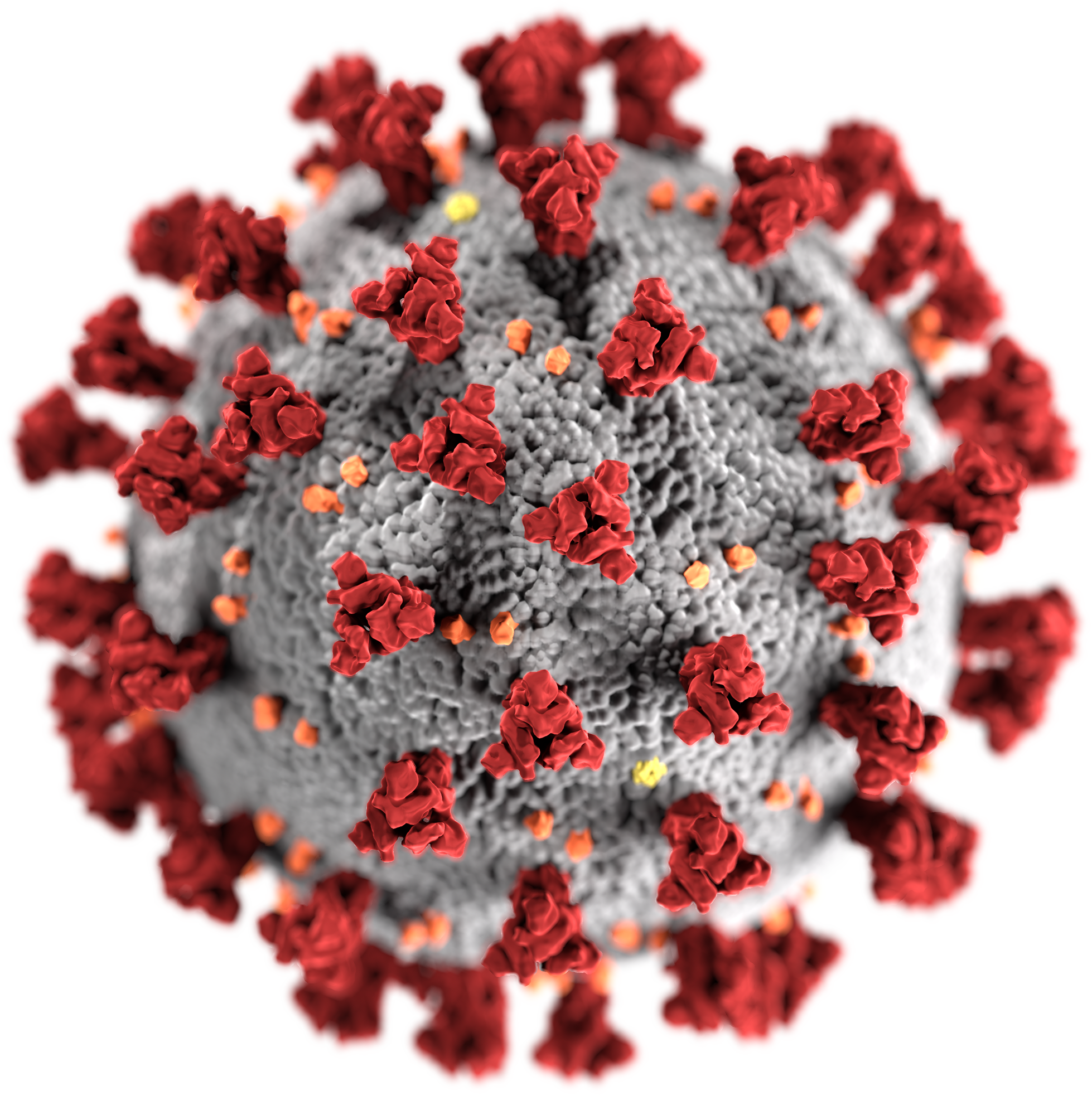
SARS-CoV-2

Johnson has conducted research on potential treatments for COVID-19. His laboratory focuses on understanding how bacteria maintain stability in metal-rich environments. Specifically, Johnson is investigating how different metals, particularly copper, can interfere with the functions of the virus. Along with his research into COVID-19 Johnson has also focused on the different usages of copper to treat harmful bacteria like Streptococcus pneumoniae.

In addition to his research, Johnson has made contributions to science outreach and education. He established initiatives like the Science Sound Bites podcast and the Black Science Blog to simplify scientific concepts for wider audiences. He organized events such as DNA Day Memphis, aimed at educating young people about genetics and genomics.

Recently, Johnson used the pivot to virtual learning during the pandemic to co-found the National Summer Undergraduate Research Project (NSURP) to connect minority undergraduate students with mentors in the microbial sciences. This initiative provides virtual summer research experiences for underrepresented students who have been impacted by the COVID-19 pandemic, supporting approximately 130 Black, 9 indigenous, and 125 Hispanic students with a total of over 350 students placed into mentorship. Johnson's work on helping mentor students goes beyond just helping students but also helping mentors to understand how to mentor students from different diverse backgrounds.

Outside the lab Johnson has given public talks on copper, one of his favorite topics, and its affects on microbes as well as being involved in multiple digital events such as the Black in Bacteriology panel.

== Awards ==
Johnson has won multiple awards for his contributions to the field of science and to education such as the 2020 Forever Duke award for his work on the National Summer Undergraduate Research Project. In 2021 he won the ASM William A. Hinton Award for Advancement of a Diverse Community of Microbiologists. Johnson won the 2021 Changemaker Award for his work on National Summer Undergraduate Research Project. In 2023 he was named inaugural Keating Family BIO5 Professor for his impact and research into interdisciplinary biosciences as well as his role in mentorship and education.

== Personal life ==
Michael Johnson was born in 1982 to a single-parent household in Chicago, Illinois. Johnson and his wife Elisha have two daughters, Michaela and Camille. Throughout his career, Johnson has also said that his musician background has helped him stay grounded while being a biologist.
