= AlphaKnot =

Database and web server for analyzing knots in protein structures

- Website type: Scientific database and web server
- Available in: English
- Owner: University of Warsaw
- Creators: Joanna I. Sułkowska and collaborators
- Website: alphaknot.cent.uw.edu.pl
- Commercial: No
- Registration: Not required
- Launched: 2022
- Current status: Active

AlphaKnot is a scientific database and web server for detecting, classifying, and visualizing protein knots and other forms of protein-chain entanglement. It was developed to facilitate the analysis of protein structures predicted by AlphaFold and other machine-learning methods, but can also be used to analyze experimentally determined structures.

The current version, AlphaKnot 2.0, combines two closely related components: a precomputed database containing proteins identified as knotted in large-scale structure-prediction datasets, and an analysis server that allows users to investigate the topology of individual protein structures in greater detail.

== Background ==
A protein is represented by a three-dimensional open chain, and determining whether that chain contains a mathematical knot requires the chain to be closed by an auxiliary procedure. The result can depend on how the closure is performed, particularly for shallow knots or chains with complicated geometry. AlphaKnot therefore provides both probabilistic and deterministic closure procedures and reports the resulting knot type together with additional information about the location of the knotted region.

AlphaKnot was initially developed to analyze the rapidly growing number of protein structures predicted by AlphaFold. The expansion of structure-prediction databases made it possible to search for protein knots on a scale that was not practical using experimentally determined structures alone.

== Database ==
AlphaKnot 2.0 contains precomputed topology information for high-quality structures from the fourth version of the AlphaFold Protein Structure Database (AlphaFold DB). The database includes AlphaFold models with an average full-chain pLDDT score of at least 70 in the primary dataset. More than 680,000 AlphaFold models were identified as having nontrivial topology in the database at the time of publication.

For the large-scale analysis, candidate knots were initially identified using probabilistic closure. Models identified as potentially knotted were subsequently reanalysed using a larger number of closures to improve the reliability of the assignment. The database records the dominant knot type and the estimated probability of observing that topology.

For proteins shorter than 400 amino acids that were identified as knotted in the AlphaFold dataset, AlphaKnot 2.0 also includes independently generated ESMFold predictions. These models can be compared with the corresponding AlphaFold structures to determine whether the same topology is obtained by two independent structure-prediction methods.

The database contains information including the protein and gene names, sequence length, taxonomic classification, UniProt and other database identifiers, whole-chain and knot-core pLDDT values, knot probability, knot-core boundaries, and the predicted model used for the analysis.

The database also retains selected data from the original AlphaKnot release based on the first version of the AlphaFold Database. AlphaKnot 2.0 additionally provides downloadable lists of structures classified as unknotted or excluded because of insufficient prediction confidence.

== Topology detection ==
Because protein chains are open, AlphaKnot uses closure procedures before applying knot invariants. Its probabilistic method repeatedly closes the chain using randomly selected points on a large surrounding sphere and assigns the dominant topology obtained from the ensemble of closures. Deterministic alternatives connect the chain termini using prescribed geometries, including a direct closure and a closure constructed using the centre of mass.

Knot identification uses the HOMFLY polynomial to distinguish knot types. AlphaKnot recognizes knots with minimal representations containing up to 12 crossings. In large-scale database calculations, structures that exhibit evidence of a nontrivial knot are subsequently analysed to determine the corresponding knot core, the smallest portion of the protein chain required to retain the detected topology.

The database primarily reports the topology of the complete protein chain. More detailed information about subchain topologies can be obtained by calculating a knot map, which records the topology of different portions of the sequence. Because producing full knot maps for hundreds of thousands of structures would require substantial computational resources, these calculations are performed on demand rather than precomputed for the entire AlphaFold DB v4 dataset.

== Web server ==
The AlphaKnot web server accepts protein structures in PDB or mmCIF format and can process both single-chain and multi-chain structures. For AlphaFold models, the server can use the pLDDT values stored in the structure file when assessing the reliability of the predicted topology. ESMFold predictions can also be obtained directly from the server using MGnify identifiers for supported proteins.

Users can select the topology-detection method and calculation accuracy. The output includes the predicted knot type, knot probability, knot-core information, and visual representations of the structure. A knot map can be generated to show where different topological features occur along the protein sequence.

AlphaKnot 2.0 incorporates the knot_pull method to visualize the topology of a protein structure. The method progressively simplifies the three-dimensional chain, approximating the effect of pulling the chain ends toward the termini, until its essential topological structure becomes easier to see. The resulting trajectory can be viewed and downloaded from the analysis page.

The server can also search the AlphaKnot database for proteins structurally or sequentially similar to the analysed model and display their predicted knot types. This comparison can help assess whether an unusual topology is conserved among related proteins or may instead result from an error in an individual predicted structure.

== Assessment of predicted knots ==
A particular challenge in analysing AlphaFold models is distinguishing genuine topology from structural prediction artefacts. A high confidence score does not by itself guarantee that a predicted chain crossing is correct, and incorrect modelling of termini or flexible regions may change the calculated topology.

AlphaKnot 2.0 therefore provides several measures intended to help evaluate a predicted knot, including the pLDDT values of the complete chain and knot core, the confidence near the boundaries of the knot core, and detection of unusually close contacts between Cα atoms. Users can also compare AlphaFold predictions with independently generated ESMFold models for shorter proteins.

Because automated analysis at the scale of the AlphaFold database cannot be manually verified structure by structure, AlphaKnot 2.0 introduced a user annotation system. Database entries can be assessed by users as a knot, artifact, or unsure, allowing potentially incorrect predictions to be flagged for further consideration.

== Relationship to KnotProt ==
AlphaKnot complements KnotProt, a database focused on experimentally determined protein structures and their topological features. KnotProt provides detailed descriptions of knots, slipknots, and related entanglements in experimentally characterized proteins, whereas AlphaKnot was developed primarily to examine the much larger population of structures generated by modern protein-structure prediction methods.

== Applications ==
AlphaKnot has been used to investigate the frequency and distribution of knots in protein families and to identify previously uncharacterized topological architectures. Large-scale analyses of AlphaFold structures have identified unusual knot types and proteins containing multiple knots, while comparison with experimentally determined structures has provided examples in which unusual predicted topologies were subsequently confirmed experimentally.

The database can therefore be used both as a source of candidate knotted proteins for experimental investigation and as a computational tool for examining the relationship between protein sequence, structure, and topology.

== Availability ==
AlphaKnot 2.0 is freely available without registration through the University of Warsaw website. The service provides both direct analysis of user-supplied structures and access to the precomputed database of predicted knotted proteins.

== See also ==
- Protein knot
- AlphaFold
- KnotProt
- Topological domain
