= Complex lasso proteins =

Complex lasso proteins (also called pierced lasso bundles or tadpoles) are proteins in which a covalent loop (portion of the backbone closed with a covalent bridge) is pierced by another piece of the backbone. Subclass of complex lasso proteins are Lasso peptides in which the loop is formed by post-translational amide bridge.

== Classification of complex lassos ==
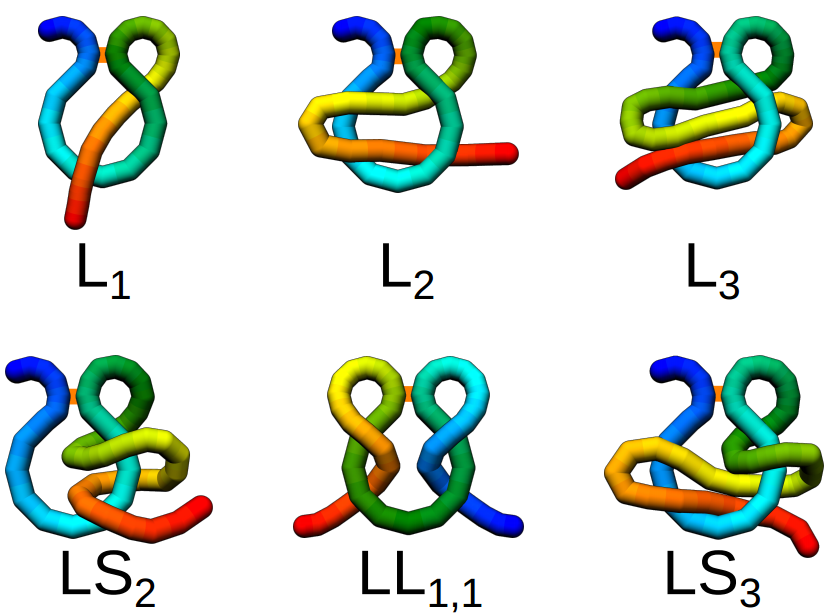
Some lasso motifs present in protein structures.

Complex lassos can be divided according to the number of piercings through the minimal surface spanned on the covalent loop. In particular, four classes of complex lasso proteins exist:

- the L_{n} class (simple lasso), where one tail pierces the surface n times;
- the LS_{n} class (the supercoiling lasso), where one tail pierces the surface n times, winding around the loop;
- the LL_{i,j} class (double lasso), where both tails pierce the surface i and j times respectively;
- the LSL_{i,j} class, where one tail pierces the surface i times in the supercoiling manner, and the second pierces the surface in the simple manner.

Another classification may be given according to the nature of the bridge closing the covalent loop. Most of the complex lasso proteins have a disulfide-based loop, however, the amide-based (lasso peptides) and ester-based complex lasso proteins are also known.

Complex lassos can coexist with other protein topologies. An analysis performed on the structures predicted by the AlphaFold found examples of knotted lasso proteins. The knots were present not only on the tail part of the lasso, but also on the loop itself. These motifs can be found in the membrane proteins.

== Popularity of complex lasso in proteins ==
Around 18% of proteins with disulfide bridges have complex lasso, however, much more complex lasso would be predicted when analyzing the non-interacting polymeric models. Apart from structures with only one pierced loop, there may be also chains with several complex lasso structures. In particular, the loops may pierce each other, forming a protein Hopf link. There are much less complex lassos in proteins than it is expected from simple polymer models. However, there are groups of proteins which have higher complex lasso probability than we could expect from such models.

Over 2.2 million complex lasso motifs were found in the AlphaFold-predicted proteins. The result of this search is available in the database section of the AlphaLasso web server.

== Biological role ==
It is not known if the complex lasso motif is functional in general. However, in some cases the importance of the motif for the protein function was reported. In particular, in case of lasso peptides, the motif allows to act like a plug for specific NTP-uptake channels. The motif has also shown significant inhibitory activities against cancer cell invasion and migration. However, multiple cyclized isomers of the peptide display this migration inhibition, suggesting the function arises from the cyclization of the peptide and not the lasso motif. On the other hand, the motif was shown to be functional in case of leptin - the obesity-related protein. The analysis of the shape of complex lasso proteins compared to the polymeric models with similar size shows, that some classes of complex lasso proteins may also be functional. This concerns toxic, antimicrobial, defensin-like or immune system related with L_{1} motif

== Computer tools to analyze the complex lasso topology ==
The current list of experimentally obtained complex lasso proteins may be found in the LassoProt database, which allows also uploading and analyzing own data. The AlphaLasso web server enables analysis of AI-predicted protein structures and provides a database of disulfide-based loops in the AlphaFold-predicted models. The manual inspection of the data is also possible with the PyLasso - a PyMol plugin.

== See also ==
Knotted proteins
