= Knotted polymers =

Single Chain Cyclized/Knotted Polymers are a new class of polymer architecture with a general structure consisting of multiple intramolecular cyclization units within a single polymer chain. Such a structure was synthesized via the controlled polymerization of multivinyl monomers, which was first reported in Dr. Wenxin Wang's research lab. These multiple intramolecular cyclized/knotted units mimic the characteristics of complex knots found in proteins and DNA which provide some elasticity to these structures. Of note, 85% of elasticity in natural rubber is due to knot-like structures within its molecular chain.
An intramolecular cyclization reaction is where the growing polymer chain reacts with a vinyl functional group on its own chain, rather than with another growing chain in the reaction system. In this way the growing polymer chain covalently links to itself in a fashion similar to that of a knot in a piece of string. As such, single chain cyclized/knotted polymers consist of many of these links (intramolecularly cyclized), as opposed to other polymer architectures including branched and crosslinked polymers that are formed by two or more polymer chains in combination.

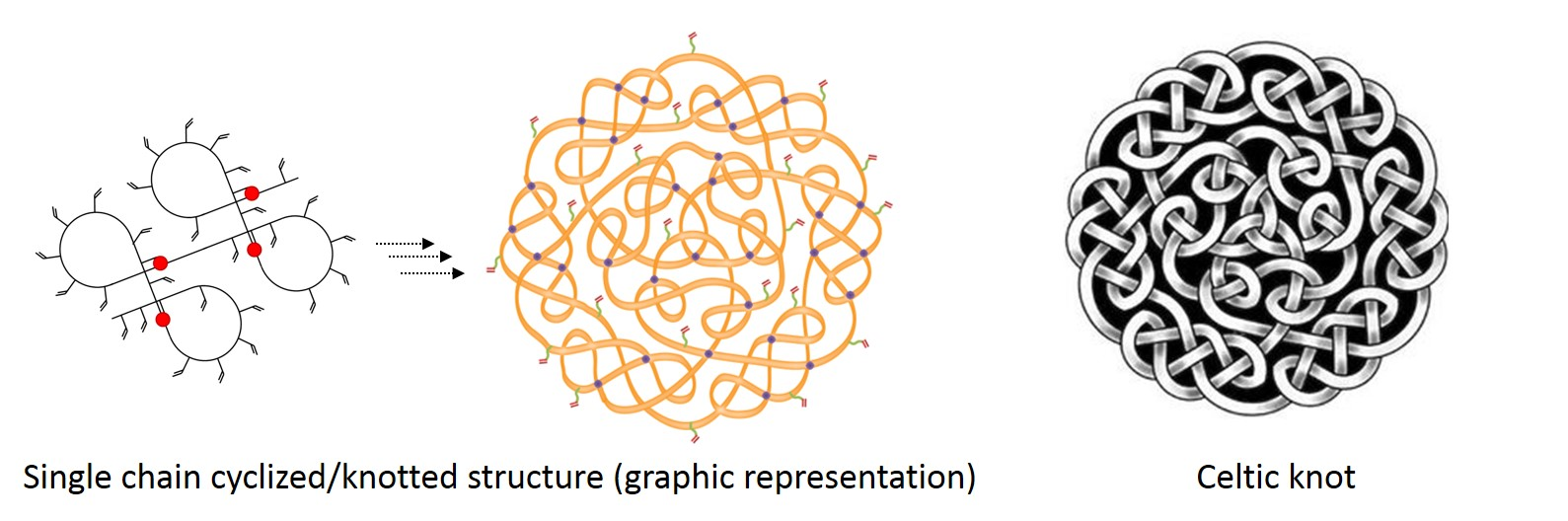
Figure 1. Single chain cyclized/knotted polymer, analogous to a Celtic knot.

Linear polymers can also fold into knotted topologies via non-covalent linkages. Knots and slipknots have been identified in naturally evolved polymers such as proteins as well. Circuit topology and knot theory formalise and classify such molecular conformations.

== Synthesis ==
=== Deactivation enhanced ATRP ===
A simple modification to atom transfer radical polymerization (ATRP) was introduced in 2007 to kinetically control the polymerization by increasing the ratio of inactive copper(II) catalyst to active copper(I) catalyst. The modification to this strategy is termed deactivation enhanced ATRP, whereby different ratios of copper(II)/copper(I) are added. Alternatively a copper(II) catalyst may be used in the presence of small amounts of a reducing agent such as ascorbic acid to produce low percentages of copper(I) in situ and to control the ratio of copper (II)/copper (I). Deactivation enhanced ATRP features the decrease of the instantaneous kinetic chain length ν as defined by:$\nu = \frac{R_{\text{p}}}{R_{\text{deac}}} = \frac{k_{\text{p}} [\text{M}][\text{P}]}{k_{\text{deac}} [\text {Cu}^{\text{II}}][\text{P}]} = \frac{k_{\text{p}}[\text{M}]}{k_{\text{deac}} [{\text{Cu}^{\text{II}}}]}$,
meaning an average number of monomer units are added to a propagating chain end during each activation/deactivation cycle, The resulting chain growth rate is slowed down to allow sufficient control over the reaction thus greatly increasing the percentage of multi-vinyl monomers in the reaction system (even up to 100 percent (homopolymerization)).

=== Polymerization process ===
Typically, single chain cyclized/knotted polymers are synthesized by deactivation enhanced ATRP of multivinyl monomers via kinetically controlled strategy. There are several main reactions during this polymerization process: initiation, activation, deactivation, chain propagation, intramolecular cyclization and intermolecular crosslinking. The polymerization process is explained in Figure 2.

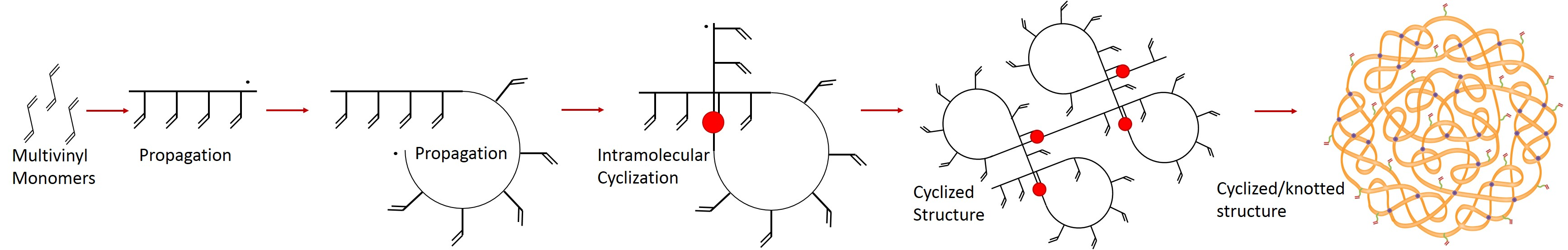
Figure 2. Single chain cyclized/knotted polymers synthesis approach.

In a similar way to normal ATRP, the polymerization is started by initiation to produce a free radical, followed by chain propagation and reversible activation/deactivation equilibrium. Unlike the polymerization of single vinyl monomers, for the polymerization of multivinyl monomers, the chain propagation occurs between the active centres and one of the vinyl groups from the free monomers. Therefore, multiple unreacted pendent vinyl groups are introduced into the linear primary polymer chains, resulting in a high local/spatial vinyl concentration. As the chain grows, the propagating centre reacts with their own pendent vinyl groups to form intramolecular cyclized rings (i.e. intramolecular cyclization). The unique alternating chain propagation/intramolecular cyclization process eventually leads to the single chain cyclized/knotted polymer architecture.

=== Intramolecular cyclization or intermolecular crosslinking ===
It is worthy to note that due to the multiple reactive sites of the multivinyl monomers, plenty of unreacted pendent vinyl groups are introduced to linear primary polymer chains. These pendent vinyl groups have the potential to react with propagating active centres either from their own polymer chain or others. Therefore, both of the intramolecular cyclization and intermolecular crosslinking might occur in this process.

Using the deactivation enhanced strategy, a relatively small instantaneous kinetic chain length limits the number of vinyl groups that can be added to a propagating chain end during each activation/deactivation cycles and thus keeps the polymer chains growing in a limited space. In this way, unlike what happens in free radical polymerization (FRP), the formation of huge polymer chains and large-scale combinations at early reaction stages is avoided. Therefore, a small instantaneous kinetic chain length is the prerequisite for further manipulation of intramolecular cyclization or intermolecular crosslinking. Based on the small instantaneous kinetic chain length, regulation of different chain dimensions and concentrations would lead to distinct reaction types. A low ratio of initiator to monomer would result in the formation of longer chains but of a lower chain concentration, This scenario would no doubt increases the chances of intramolecular cyclization due to the high local/spatial vinyl concentration within the growth boundary. Although the opportunity for intermolecular reactions can increase as the polymer chains grow, the likelihood of this occurring at the early stage of reactions is minimal due to the low chain concentration, which is why single chain cyclized/knotted polymers can form. However, in contrast, a high initiator concentration not only diminishes the chain dimension during the linear-growth phase thus suppressing the intramolecular cyclization, but it also increases the chain concentration within the system so that pendent vinyl groups in one chain are more likely to fall into the growth boundary of another chain. Once the monomers are converted to short chains, the intermolecular combination increases and allows the formation of hyperbranched structures with a high density of branching and vinyl functional groups.

=== Note ===
- The monomer concentration is important for the synthesis of single chain cyclized/knotted polymers, but the kinetic chain length is the key determining factor for synthesis.

== Applications ==
Single chain cyclized polymers consist of multiple cyclized rings which afford them some unique properties, including high density, low intrinsic viscosity, low translational friction coefficients, high glass transition temperatures, and excellent elasticity of the formed network. In particular, an abundance of internal space makes the single chain cyclized polymers ideal candidates as efficient cargo-carriers.

=== Gene delivery ===
It is well established that the macromolecular structure of nonviral gene delivery vectors alters their transfection efficacy and cytotoxicity. The cyclized structure has been proven to reduce cytotoxicity and increase circulation time for drug and gene delivery applications. The unique structure of cyclizing chains provides the single chain cyclized polymers a different method of interaction between the polymer and plasmid DNA, and results in a general trend of higher transfection capabilities than branched polymers. Moreover, due to the nature of the single chain structure, this cyclized polymer can “untie” to a linear chain under reducing conditions. Transfection profiles on astrocytes comparing 25 kDa-PEI, SuperFect® and Lipofectamine®2000 and cyclized polymer showed greater efficiency and cell viability whilst maintaining neural cell viability above 80% four days post transfections.

== See also ==
- Polymer architecture
- Branching (polymer chemistry)
- Molecular knot
- Knotted protein
