= Polymer architecture =

Branch point in a polymer

Polymer architecture in polymer science relates to the way branching leads to a deviation from a strictly linear polymer chain. Branching may occur randomly or reactions may be designed so that specific architectures are targeted. It is an important microstructural feature. A polymer's architecture affects many of its physical properties including solution viscosity, melt viscosity, solubility in various solvents, glass transition temperature and the size of individual polymer coils in solution.

== Different polymer architectures ==
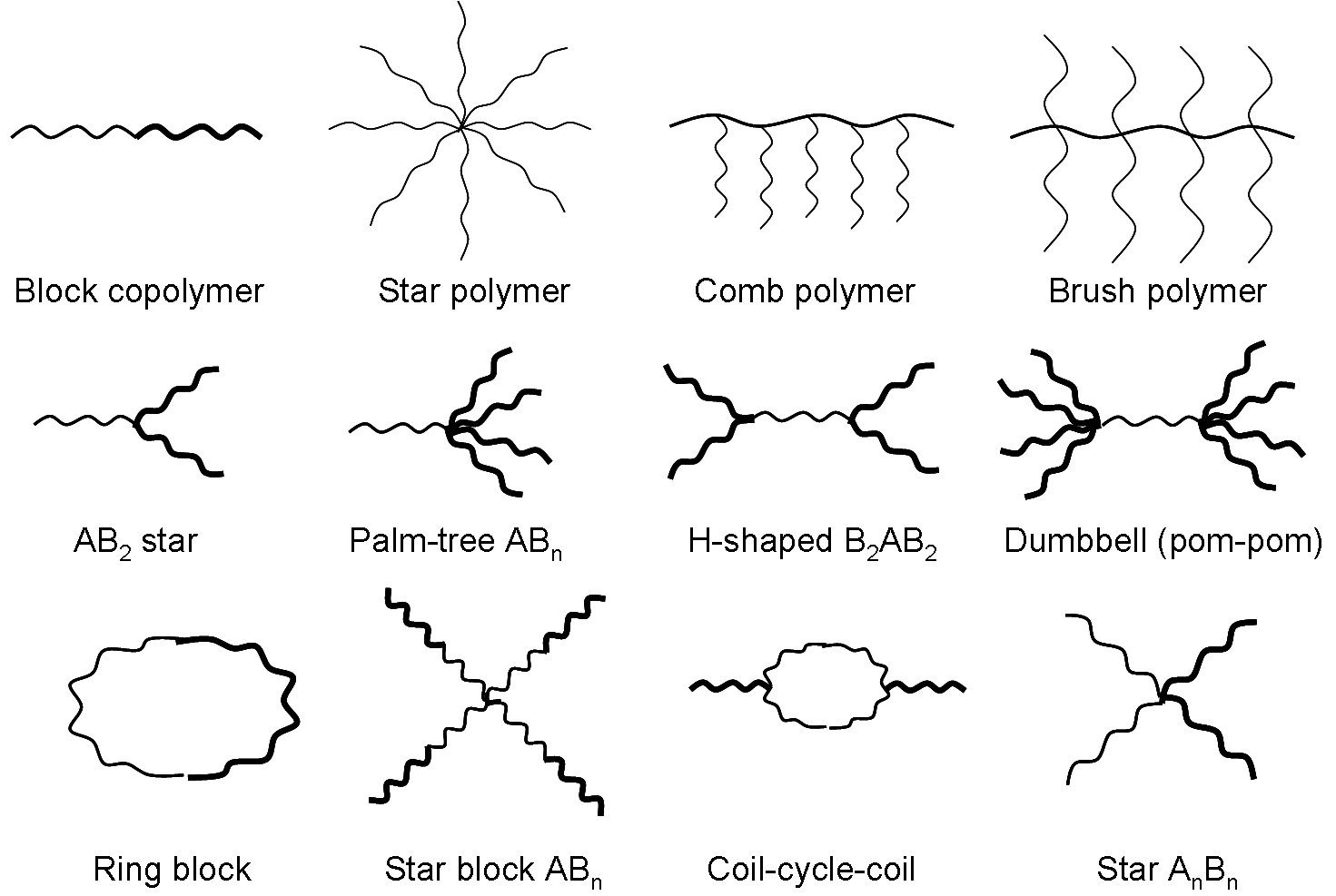
Various polymer architectures.

=== Random branching ===
Branches can form when the growing end of a polymer molecule reaches either (a) back around onto itself or (b) onto another polymer chain, both of which, via abstraction of a hydrogen, can create a mid-chain growth site.

Branching can be quantified by the branching index.

=== Cross linked polymer ===
An effect related to branching is chemical crosslinking - the formation of covalent bonds between chains. Crosslinking tends to increase T_{g} and increase strength and toughness. Among other applications, this process is used to strengthen rubbers in a process known as vulcanization, which is based on crosslinking by sulfur. Car tires, for example, are highly crosslinked in order to reduce the leaking of air out of the tire and to toughen their durability. Eraser rubber, on the other hand, is not crosslinked to allow flaking of the rubber and prevent damage to the paper. Polymerization of pure sulfur at higher temperatures also explains why sulfur becomes more viscous with elevated temperatures in its molten state.

A polymer molecule with a high degree of crosslinking is referred to as a polymer network. A sufficiently high crosslink to chain ratio may lead to the formation of a so-called infinite network or gel, in which each chain is connected to at least one other.

=== Complex architectures ===
With the continual development of Living polymerization, the synthesis of polymers with specific architectures becomes more and more facile. Architectures such as star polymers, comb polymers, brush polymers, dendronized polymers, dendrimers, Ring polymers and star-on-star polymers are possible. Complex architecture polymers can be synthesized either with the use of specially tailored starting compounds or by first synthesising linear chains which undergo further reactions to become connected together. Knotted polymers consist of multiple intramolecular cyclization units within a single polymer chain. Linear polymers may also fold into topological circuits, formally classified by their contact topology.

== Effect of architecture on physical properties ==
In general, the higher degree of branching, the more compact a polymer chain is. Branching also affects chain entanglement, the ability of chains to slide past one another, in turn affecting the bulk physical properties. Long chain branches may increase polymer strength, toughness, and the glass transition temperature (T_{g}) due to an increase in the number of entanglements per chain. A random and short chain length between branches, on the other hand, may reduce polymer strength due to disruption of the chains' ability to interact with each other or crystallize.

An example of the effect of branching on physical properties can be found in polyethylene. High-density polyethylene (HDPE) has a very low degree of branching, is relatively stiff, and is used in applications such as bullet-proof vests. Low-density polyethylene (LDPE), on the other hand, has significant numbers of both long and short branches, is relatively flexible, and is used in applications such as plastic films.

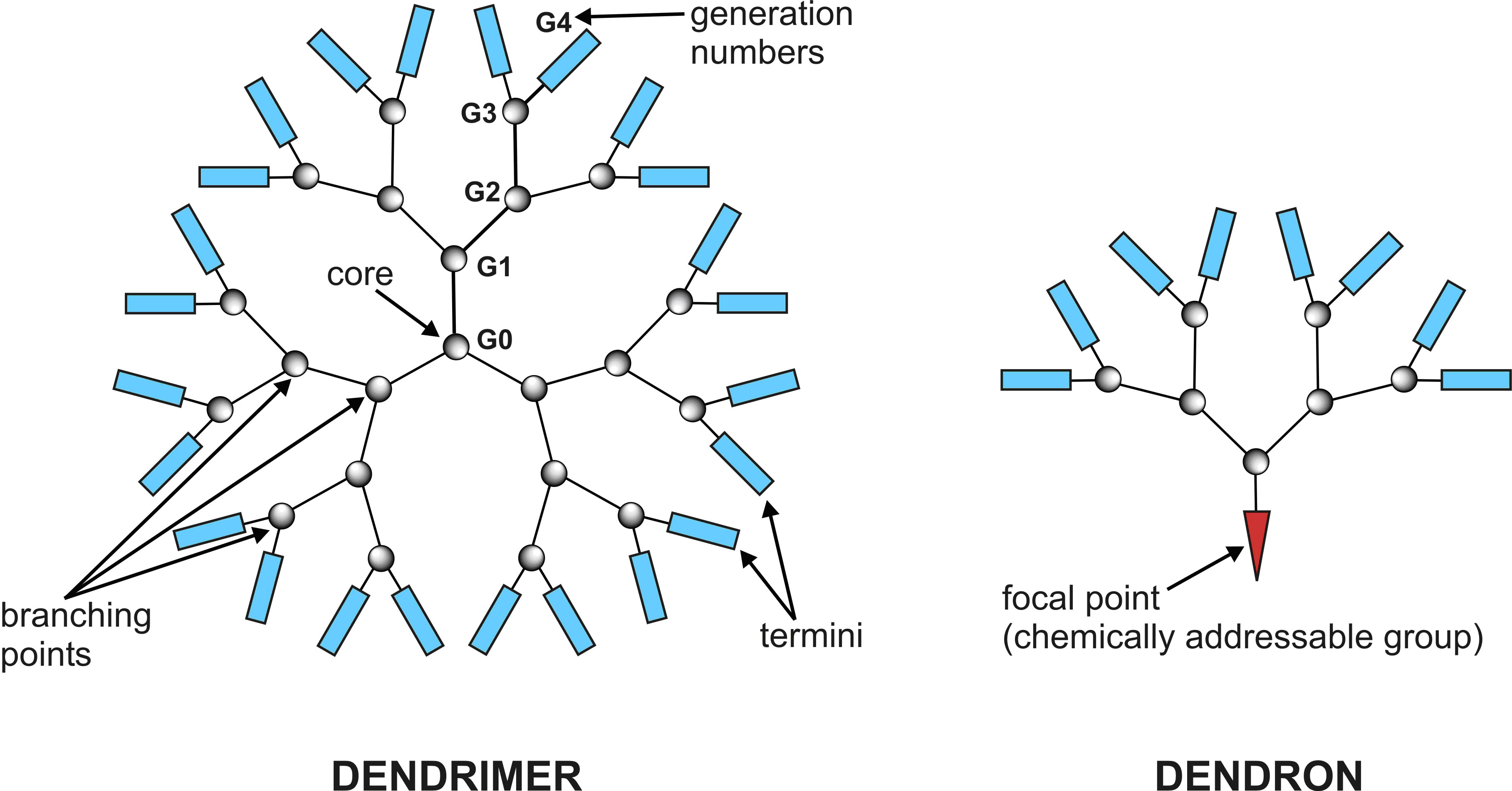
Dendrimer and dendron

Dendrimers are a special case of branched polymer where every monomer unit is also a branch point. This tends to reduce intermolecular chain entanglement and crystallization. A related architecture, the dendritic polymer, are not perfectly branched but share similar properties to dendrimers due to their high degree of branching.

The degree of branching that occurs during polymerisation can be influenced by the functionality of the monomers that are used. For example, in a free radical polymerisation of styrene, addition of divinylbenzene, which has a functionality of 2, will result in the formation of branched polymer.

== See also ==
- Circuit topology (fold architecture of linear polymers)
