= Malaria Eradication Scientific Alliance =

Research consortium

The Malaria Eradication Scientific Alliance (MESA) is an organization founded on the research carried out by the Malaria Eradication Research Agenda (malERA). "malERA" was a project carried out by the scientific community to identify the steps and future research that must be done in order to eradicate malaria. It was created after the Malaria Forum in 2007, hosted by the Bill and Melinda Gates Foundation, reestablished malaria eradication as a long-term goal. "malERA" first launched in 2008, and resulted in a research and development agenda which was published in a PLoS Medicine magazine in 2011. MESA was formed in 2012 to continue the goals of malERA through research and development of methods to fight malaria. Its secretariat is located in the Barcelona Institute for Global Health.

== Goals ==
As stated on the MESA website, MESA aims to "advance the science of malaria eradication by providing the community with a dedicated hub to track research, share relevant resources, and showcase examples of elimination programs". MESA does this through the pioneering of new ideas, managing knowledge and research, support of research projects through funding, and monitoring progress.

== Governance ==
MESA is governed by a Steering Committee and is guided by the MESA Strategic Advisory Council. The Alliance is composed of international global health institutions, countries in which malaria is a significant problem, and the WHO Global Malaria Programme. Much of the organization is hosted by the Barcelona Institute for Global Health, and the Alliance is funded by a grant from the Bill and Melinda Gates Foundation. MESA is composed of 740 institutions in 94 countries and has 806 projects in progress.

== Grantmaking ==
One of the main ways MESA contributes to research is through grants for projects which would help to fight malaria. These projects tend to fall within three categories: Health Systems' Readiness, Measurement of Transmission, and Operational research. The projects tend to last an average of two years and work with a maximum budget of $200,000. A list of grants is available on the MESA website.

== History and projects ==
MESA was developed in a meeting of malaria experts in Sitges, Spain from 28–29 May 2012.

In 2012, MESA began a process to select science research projects dealing with the measurement of transmission of malaria and the preparation of health systems to fight malaria. Six projects were selected total to receive funding from MESA and another was supported to raise funds from other organizations. The projects conduct research in Africa, Asia, Latin America, and Australasia.

In 2014, four new projects were selected. These projects include: new tools for vector control and diagnosis, use of monitoring and response mapping technologies, and mobile applications for hard to reach populations.

In June 2015, MESA lead a process called "malERA Refresh" to review and update malERA. This project examines 6 different subjects: "basic science and enabling technologies, insecticide and drug resistance, characterizing the reservoir and measuring transmission, tools for elimination, combination interventions and modeling, health systems and policy research." "malERA" Refresh is expected to be complete and available for open publication by the end of 2016.

Other current projects include MESA's goal to eradicate the Plasmodium falciparum and Plasmodium vivax malaria strains in China by 2020.

== Partners ==
- Institut de recherche pour le developpement
- Malawi Liverpool Wellcome Trust Clinical Research Programme
- Eijkman Institute for Molecular Biology
- Duke Global Health Institute
- ISGlobal
- Malaria Mission
- Radboud University Nijmegen Medical Center
- Burnet Institute
- Keystone Symposia on Molecular and Cellular Biology
- Centro de Investigação em Saúde de Manhiça
- Institut Pasteur
- The Multilateral Initiative on Malaria (MIM)
- University of California San Francisco
- Swiss Tropical and Public Health Institute
- FIND
- Imperial College London
- malERA
- MalariaWorld
- Liverpool School of Tropical Medicine
- uber Research
- Malaria Control and Elimination Partnership in Africa
- Malaria Vaccine Initiative
- Special Programme for Research and Training in Tropical Diseases (TDR)
- American Society of Tropical Medicine and Hygiene
- University of Health and Allied Sciences
- Project Diameter
- Fundacao de Medicine Tropical Doutor Heitor Vieira Dourado
- Akros Global Health
- Malaria Consortium
- Mahidol University
- President's Malaria Initiative
- Malaria Atlas Project
- London School of Hygiene & Tropical Medicine Alaria Centre
- Clinton Health Access Initiative
- World Health Organization
- Asia pacific malaria elimination network
- Harvard School of Public Health
- Department of Defense Armed Forces Pest Management Board
