= Curtis C. Harris =

American cancer researcher

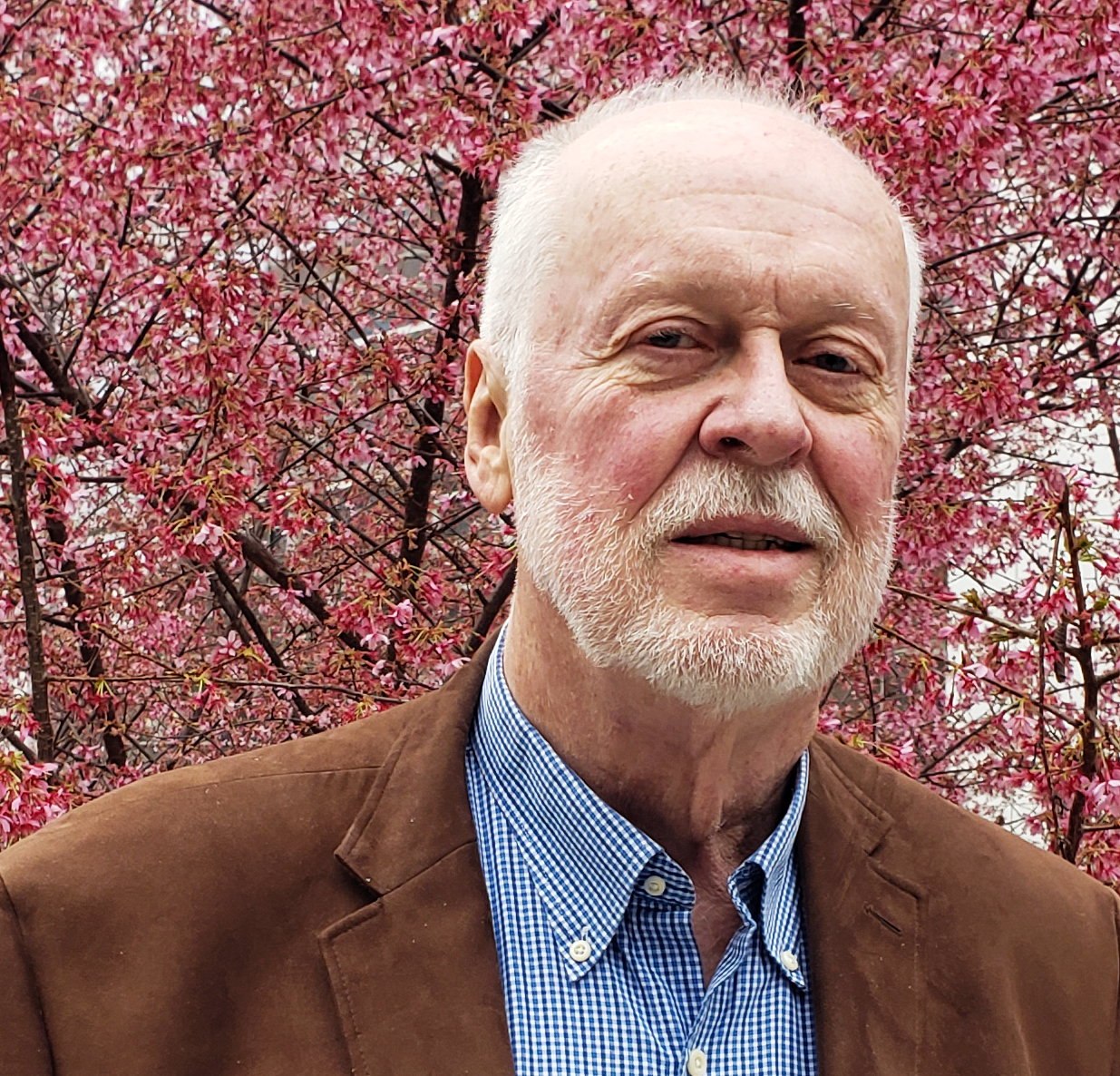
- Harris in 2020
- Born: Anthony, Kansas, U.S.
- Education: B.A., University of Kansas (1965); M.D., University of Kansas School of Medicine (1969); Intern Certificate, Internal Medicine, U.C.L.A. Hospital, Los Angeles (1970), CA; Resident Certificate, Internal Medicine, V.A. Hospital, Washington, DC (1976)
- Alma mater: University of Kansas
- Known for: p53, Molecular Epidemiology, Cancer Metabolome, Molecular basis of Cancer, Precision Cancer Medicine
- Spouse: Tance Harris
- Children: Brent Harris, Jill Harris, Todd Harris and Megan Harris
- Awards: Member, board of directors (1984), American Association for Cancer Research; Fellow of the American Society for Clinical Investigation (1995); Walter Hubert Award: British Association for Cancer Research (1995); Lewis M. Schiffer Memorial Award and Lecturer Cell Proliferation Society (1996); Bob Champion Award and Lecturer British Oncological Association (1996); Distinguished Service Medal (1999), highest award of the US Public Health Service; Award of Merit Princess Takamatsu Cancer Research Foundation (2002); Fellow of the American Association for the Advancement of Science (2003); NCI Outstanding Mentor Award (2007); NIH MERIT Award (2009); AACR-Princess Takamutsu Award (2009); AACR Cancer Epidemiology Biomarkers and Prevention Award (2014); University of Kansas School of Medicine award recipient (2016) Environment Mutagenesis and Genome Society Award (2020); Fellow, Academy of AACR (2021)
- Scientific career
- Fields: Cancer Research, molecular epidemiology
- Workplaces: National Cancer Institute, Laboratory of Human Carcinogenesis
- Website: ccr.cancer.gov/Laboratory-of-Human-Carcinogenesis/curtis-c-harris

Curtis. C. Harris is the head of the Molecular Genetics and Carcinogenesis Section and chief of the Laboratory of Human Carcinogenesis at the Center for Cancer Research of the National Cancer Institute, NIH.

Harris graduated from University of Kansas with a BA in zoology in 1965, and an MD in 1969. He was an internal medicine intern at UCLA hospital in 1969. He did research and completed his medical oncology training at NCI and Washington Veterans Hospital. Since 1981, he has been head of the Molecular Genetics and Carcinogenesis Section and chief of the Laboratory of Human Carcinogenesis. He is also a lecturer of medicine and oncology at Georgetown University School of Medicine. He has published more than 700 journal articles and has been awarded 30 patents.

His current research focuses on Precision Medicine of Cancer and Aging. His research career has focused on environmental, genetic and epigenomic causes of human carcinogenesis.

He is also a co-author of the international spy novel High Hand using a pseudonym Curtis J. James.

== Research ==
Harris has made many major discoveries in cancer research. One of the most notable is his seminal work describing the first-known molecular link between an environmental carcinogen, aflatoxin B1, and a specific mutation at codon 249 of the p53-encoding TP53 gene in hepatocellular carcinoma (Nature 350:427, 1991 and web of science). This discovery was selected by the AACR as a Centennial Landmark in Cancer Research. In addition, his paper on the TP53 mutation spectrum is among the most highly cited in the biomedical research field, with over 9,000 citations and web of science (Science 253:49, 1991). These findings have had, and continue to have, a major impact in cancer risk assessment and biomarker discovery for cancer prevention, diagnosis and prognosis.

Harris's research has investigated mechanistic, translational, and functional links between population and basic science research. When the focus of cancer research was on in vitro human and in vitro animal models, he pioneered investigations of carcinogen metabolism, DNA damage, and DNA repair and mutagenesis in humans and in human tissues (e.g., Science 194:1067, 1976; Cancer Res 44:2855, 1984). Many of these studies were among the first to highlight the deleterious effects of tobacco carcinogens and their damage to human health (e.g., Cancer Res. 33: 2842–2848, 1973; Nature 247: 48–49, 1974, Nature 252: 68–69, 1974), providing an evidence base for tobacco control policies. Moreover, he led the development of first-in-kind in vitro models of human bronchial epithelial cells from patient explants (e.g., Cancer Res. 36: 1003–1010, 1976, Nature 252: 68–69, 1974). In parallel, he has extensively investigated p53 functions in the regulation of DNA repair, apoptosis, senescence, and tumorigenicity (e.g., Nat Genet. 10:188, 1995; Nat Med. 4:137,1998; Nat Cell Biol 11:1135, 2009; Nat Cell Biol, 12: 1205, 2010) and recently a microbiome – TP53 mutation interaction in human lung cancer, Genome Biology:19: 123–29, 2018.

Decades prior to the recent discovery of mutant TP53 cells in esophageal tissue (Cell Stem Cell 25:321-41, 2019; Science 362:911-17, 2018), Drs. Peter Cerruti and Curtis Harris, using the novel and highly sensitive TP53 mutational load assay, discovered TP53 mutant DNA in non-malignant lung and plasma in tobacco smokers (PNAS 97: 12770–5, 2000; Science 264: 1317–19, 1994; Cancer Res. 66: 8309–17, 2000). In the past decade, Harris has contributed substantially to research on TP53 mutations, as well as TP53 isoforms and their effects on senescence, aging and cancer (Fujita K, et al., Nat Cell Biol 11:1135–41, 2009; Mondal A, et al., J Clin Invest 123:5247-57, 2013; Turnquist C. et al., Cell Death Differ 23: 1515–28,2016; Hirokawa I. et al., Cell Death Differ 24: 1017–28, 2017; Von Muhlinen N., et al., Oncogene 37: 2379–93, 2018; Mondal, AM. et al., Cell Death and Dis 9: 750–804, 2018; Turnquist C. et al., Neuro Oncology 21: 474–85, 2019).

Translational Discoveries in Cancer Biomarkers: Harris's research aims to identify mechanistic and statistically independent biomarkers of cancer risk, diagnosis, prognosis, and therapeutic outcomes, using data from multiple ethnic and geographic cohorts. One mechanistic facet of these studies is chronic inflammation, a feature of the internal exposome (initially described by Chris Wild, Cancer Epi Biomarkers Prev 14: 1847, 2005) and an established cancer risk factor. He reported findings that increased levels of circulating interleukins are predictors of cancer risk, diagnosis, and prognosis of lung cancer patients (JNCI 99:1401, 2007; JNCI 103:1112, 2011). He also identified microRNAs associated with both diagnosis and prognosis of lung cancer (Cancer Cell 9:189, 2006; Clin Cancer Res 17: 1875, 2011) and prognosis and therapeutic outcome of colon cancer (JAMA 299:425, 2008). In addition, he reported that combinations of DNA methylation, microRNAs, and proteins (e.g. inflammation-related) produced by human lung, colon, and esophageal carcinomas are robust cancer prognostic classifiers (PNAS 106:12085, 2009; Clin Cancer Res 15:5878, 2009; Clin Cancer Res 15:6192, 2009; Clin Cancer Res 16:5824, 2010; Clin Cancer Res 17:1875, 2011; Int J Cancer 132:2901, 2013; Cancer Res 73:3821, 2013, J of Thoracic Oncology, 10: 1037–1048, 2015). Importantly, these studies identified early-stage lung and colon cancers that have poor prognoses due to the likelihood of undetected micrometastasis.

Over the past ten years, Harris has conducted several novel studies of the human metabolome and how it contributes to cancer risk assessment, cancer diagnosis and the accurate identification of early stage lung cancer patients at high-risk of tumor recurrence (Cancer Res. 74: 3259–3270, 2014; Cancer Epidemiology, Biomarkers & Prevention 25(6); 978–86, 2016).

== Accomplishments ==
Accolades include the Biomarker and Prevention Award, AACR Princess Takamatsu Award, the Oschner Award relating to Smoking and Health from the American College of Physicians, the Deichmann Award from the International Union of Toxicology, the Environment Mutagenesis and Genome Award, and the Distinguished Service Medal—the highest honor of the U.S. Public Health Service.

Harris has been an expert witness at hearings concerning OSHA Regulations on the Identification, Classification and Regulation of Toxic Substances Posing a Potential Occupational Carcinogenic Risk, a member of the technical review committee for the USPHS Surgeon General Report on Harmful Effects of Smokeless Tobacco and was a contributing a to the Surgeon General's 2004 seminal report on the Health Consequences of Smoking. Harris has also been a member of the Scientific Advisory Council at IARC. Moreover, he has demonstrated a steadfast from the 1980s to the present commitment on the Advisory Committee and honored consultant to the Radiation Effects Research Foundation in Hiroshima Japan, an organization dedicated to understanding the health consequences of radiation exposure among survivors of atomic bombs. Harris cofounded the Aspen Cancer Conference, a non-profit organization, in 1985 with Dr. Ben Trump where he serves as chairman of the board of directors.

Harris's published research has over 90,000 citations and H-index of over 140. Harris has served as Chairman of the Program Committee of the AACR Annual Meeting; member of the AACR's board of directors, Nominating Committee and many Award Committees; and chairman of the board of directors and Chairman of the Scientific Program Advisory Board for the Keystone Symposia on Molecular and Cellular Biology. He is also since 1984 to recent the editor-in-chief of the journal Carcinogenesis.

== List of accolades ==
- NSF Research Participation Awardee and Gifted Student Program, University of Kansas, (1963–1965)
- Commendation Medal, USPHS Honor Award, (1979)
- Medical Alumni Scholar and lecturer, first to be awarded, University of Kansas School of Medicine, (1982)
- NCI Equal Employment Opportunity Special Recognition Award, (1983)
- Fellow of the American Society for Clinical Investigation (1984)
- Member, board of directors, (1984) American Association for Cancer Research
- Meritorious Service Award, USPHS, (1986)
- Keynote Address, Princess Takamatsu Symposium, (1991)
- Fellow, American Society of Clinical Investigation, (1992)
- Alton Ochsner Award Relating Smoking and Health, Alton Ochsner Medical Foundation and American College of Chest Physicians, (1993)
- Keynote Address, Japanese Research Society for Gastrointestinal Cancers, (1993)
- Keynote Address, Annual Meeting, Chinese Oncology Society, (1994)
- Keynote Address, Beatson International Cancer Conference, (1995)
- Walter Hubert Award and lecturer, British Association for Cancer Research, Nottingham, (1995)
- Don Coffey Award and lecturer, Society for Basic Urological Research, Las Vegas, (1995)
- Keynote Address, 5th International Inhalation Symposium, Hannover, (1995)
- Keynote Address, Japanese Lung Cancer Society, (1995)
- Walter Hubert Award: British Association for Cancer Research (1995)
- Lewis M. Schiffer Memorial Award and lecturer, Cell Proliferation Society, Toledo, (1996)
- Bob Champion Award and lecturer, British Oncological Association, (1996)
- Lewis M. Schiffer Memorial Award and lecturer, Cell Proliferation Society (1996)
- Bob Champion Award and lecturer, British Oncological Association (1996)
- Elizabeth and James Miller Distinguished Lecturer, Rutgers University, New Jersey, (1997)
- Robert Greenfield Memorial Lecturer, University of Nebraska, (1998)
- Federal Technology Transfer Award, (1998)
- Distinguished Lectureship, Japanese Foundation for Cancer Research, Tokyo, (1998)
- Identified as one of the 50 most cited scientists in biomedical research in the 1990s (ISI Science Watch, March 1998)
- Keynote Address, 2nd International Congress on Gastroenterological Carcinogenesis, Ulm, (1999)
- Charles Heidelberger Award, International Society on Gastroenterological Carcinogenesis, Ulm, (1999)
- Distinguished Service Medal, highest award of the US Public Health Service (1999)
- Gerald N. Wogan Lecturer, Massachusetts Institute of Technology, (2000)
- Keynote Address, Molecular Epidemiology of Human Cancer Conference, International Agency for Research on Cancer, Lyon, (2000)
- Honorary Member (three foreign scientists are selected each year), Japanese Cancer Association, Tokyo (2001)
- Award of Merit, Princess Takamatsu Cancer Research Fund, Japan, (2002)
- Award of Merit, Princess Takamatsu Cancer Research Foundation (2002)
- Keynote Address, Environmental Health Conference, Lancaster, (2003)
- Fellow of the American Association for the Advancement of Science (2003)
- Keynote Address, Tenth International Toxicology Congress, Finland, (2004)
- Keynote Address, Environmental Mutagen Society United Kingdom, Bradford, (2005)
- Keynote Address, International Symposium, Chronic Oxidative Stress and Cancer: Mechanisms, Biomarkers and Prevention, German Cancer Research Center, Heidelberg, 2005
- Keynote Address and Visiting Professor: Frontiers in Biomedical Research, Hong Kong School of Medicine, Hong Kong, (2005)
- Presidential Lecture, International Liver Congress, Shanghai, (2006)
- Keynote Address, Microenvironment and Cancer Symposium, Japanese Foundation Cancer Research, Tokyo, (2006)
- State of the Art Address, International Liver Cancer Association, Barcelona, (2007)
- NCI Outstanding Mentor Award (2007)
- AACR-Princess Takamatsu Award, AACR Annual Meeting, Denver, CO, (2009)
- Keynote Address, Hiroshima Cancer Symposium, Hiroshima, Japan, (2009)
- NCI Merit Award, (2009)
- Distinguished Professor Lecture, Johns Hopkins University, School of Medicine, Baltimore, MD, (2010)
- Provost Distinguished Lecture, (Inaugural lecture), M.D. Anderson Cancer Center, Houston, TX, (2010)
- Ben Trump Memorial Lecture, Aspen Cancer Conference, Aspen, CO, (2010)
- Distinguished Lecture, Frontiers of Cancer Prevention, AACR Conference, Philadelphia, PA, (2010)
- Keynote Address, Chemistry in Cancer Research: The Biological Chemistry of Inflammation as a Cause of Cancer, AACR Conference, San Diego, CA (2011)
- NCI Outstanding Mentor Award, (2013)
- ILCA Nelson Fausto Award, International Liver Cancer Association, (2014)
- 1st Allan Conney Memorial Lecture, Rutgers University, (2014)
- AACR- American Cancer Society Award for Research Excellence in Cancer Epidemiology and Prevention and Lecture, San Diego, CA, (2014)
- Keynote Address, p53 Isoform Conference, Aix-en Provence, France, (2015)
- Keynote Address, Japan Lung Cancer Society, Yokohama, Japan, (2015)
- Distinguished Medical Alumnus Award, Kansas University School of Medicine, Kansas City, KS, (2016)
- Plenary Lecture, 8th Princess Chulabhorn International Science Congress, Environmental Health: Inter-linkage among the Environment, Chemicals and Infectious Agents, Bangkok, Thailand, (2016)
- Plenary Lecture, Precision Medicine and Lung Cancer Biomarker, AACR, Washington, DC, (2017)
- Keynote Address, 2017 Genetic Toxicology Association (GTA) Meeting, Newark, DE, (2017)
- Keynote Speaker, 3rd International p53 Isoform Workshop, Bergen, Norway, (2017)
- Keynote Speaker, 11th Annual APRU Global Health Conference, Manila, Philippines, (2017)
- Keynote Speaker, International GYN Cancer Conference, Kyoto, Japan, (2018)
- Plenary Lecture, Princess Chulabhorn Symposium, Bangkok, Thailand, (2019)
- Keynote Address, International Cell Senescence Association, Athens, Greece (2019)
- State-of-the-Art Lecture, 36th Annual Meeting of the Germany Working Community on the Study of Liver (ASL), Mainz, Germany, (2020)
- Annual Award Environment Mutagenesis and Genome Society (2020)
- Fellow, Academy of AACR (2021)
