= Keystone Symposia =

Life sciences and biomedical sciences research conferences and symposia

- Discipline: Life sciences, biomedical sciences

Publication details
- History: Founded 1972
- Frequency: 50–60 conferences annually
- Website: https://www.keystonesymposia.org

Keystone Symposia on Molecular and Cellular Biology or Keystone Symposia is an internationally recognized nonprofit organization that annually hosts 50–60 conferences and symposia covering a range of research fields in the life sciences and biomedical sciences. Most conferences are held in westward mountain venues in North America but conferences are held on six continents. The organization also hosts the annual Fellows Program for postdocs and early-career scientists from disadvantaged or underrepresented backgrounds. The 50th anniversary of Keystone Symposia occurred in 2022.

== History ==
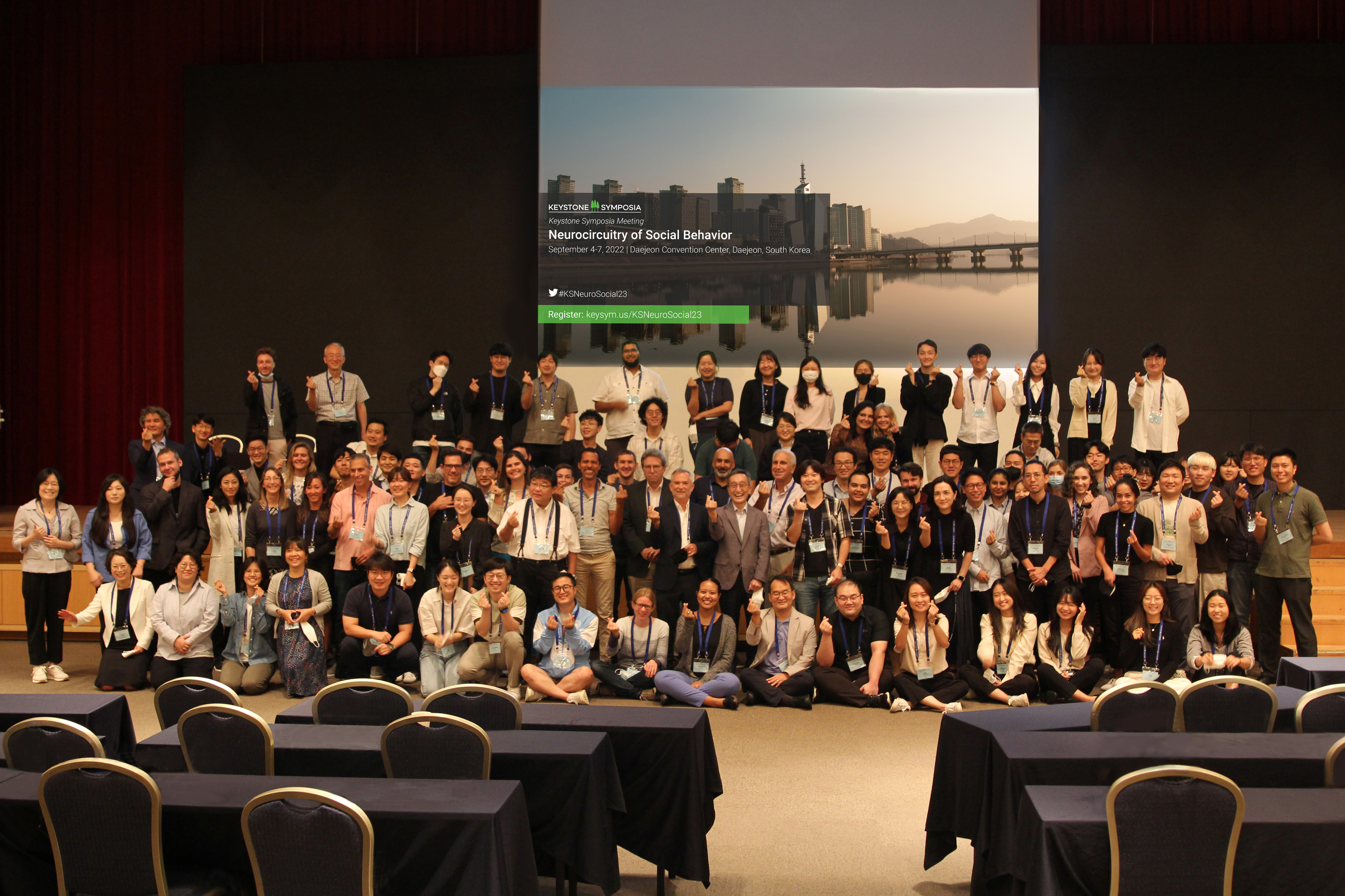
Participants of the Keystone Symposia Neurocircuitry of Social Behavior held in 2022 at the Daejeon Convention Center hosted by the Institute for Basic Science.

Believed to be inspired by European conferences located at ski resorts, Keystone was founded by C. Fred Fox, a professor of microbiology in the Molecular Biology Institute at University of California, Los Angeles (UCLA), with sponsorship from International Chemical and Nuclear Pharmaceuticals (ICN). The organization was named the ICN-UCLA Symposium on Molecular Biology and held its first conference in Palisades Tahoe at Squaw Valley, California focusing on membrane research. The initial mission was “to provide an interdisciplinary forum for scientists working in new and rapidly emerging areas of basic and applied biological research” and California was selected to act as a counterweight to the number of related conferences on the eastern United States. Ties were severed with ICN in 1981 and UCLA in 1990. Keystone relocated to Silverthorne, Colorado and became a division of The Keystone Center. Additionally, the name changed to Keystone Symposia on Molecular and Cellular Biology. Association with The Keystone Center ended after seven years.

The Symposia went internationally from 2001 by hosting in Canada. Asia followed in 2005, Europe in 2006, Africa in 2007, Australia in 2009, and South America in 2013. In response to the COVID-19 pandemic, the first virtual conference was held in 2020 and the format is referred to as eSymposia. Two years later was the 50th anniversary of Keystone Symposia. By that time, the organization has hosted approximately 1,600 meetings with 500,000 attendees.

== See also ==
- Gordon Research Conferences
- Malaria Eradication Scientific Alliance
- Vishva Dixit
- Margaret Goodell
- Curtis C. Harris
- De'Broski R. Herbert
