= Trefoil factor 1 =

Protein-coding gene in the species Homo sapiens

TFF1
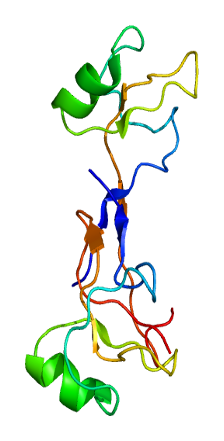

Identifiers
- Aliases: TFF1, BCEI, D21S21, HP1.A, HPS2, pNR-2, pS2, trefoil factor 1
- External IDs: OMIM: 113710; MGI: 88135; GeneCards: TFF1
Available structures
PDB	Ortholog search: PDBe RCSB
PDB	List of PDB id codes 1HI7, 1PS2

Gene location (Human)
Chr.	Chromosome 21 (human)
Band	21q22.3	Start	42,362,282 bp
Band	21q22.3	End	42,366,535 bp

Gene location (Mouse)
Chr.	Chromosome 17 (mouse)
Band	17 A3.3|17 15.8 cM	Start	31,380,369 bp
Band	17 A3.3|17 15.8 cM	End	31,384,251 bp
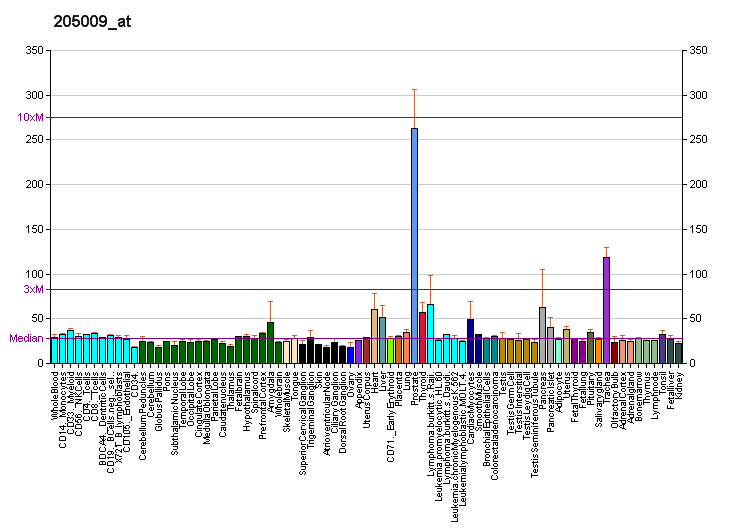
RNA expression pattern
Bgee	Human / Mouse (ortholog); Top expressed in: pancreatic ductal cell; gastric mucosa; palpebral conjunctiva; pylorus; mucosa of sigmoid colon; mucosa of ileum; gallbladder; cardia; rectum; jejunal mucosa / Top expressed in: pyloric antrum; epithelium of stomach; mucous cell of stomach; tibiofemoral joint; perirhinal cortex; entorhinal cortex; right ventricle; CA3 field; Ileal epithelium; choroid plexus of fourth ventricle; More reference expression data
BioGPS	More reference expression data
Gene ontology
Molecular function	growth factor activity; protein binding
Cellular component	extracellular space; extracellular region
Biological process	response to immobilization stress; cell differentiation; response to peptide hormone; maintenance of gastrointestinal epithelium; negative regulation of cell population proliferation; response to iron ion; wound healing; carbohydrate metabolic process; regulation of signaling receptor activity; digestion; signal transduction
Sources:Amigo / QuickGO
Orthologs
Databases	NCBI: entry; OMA: entry
Species	Human	Mouse
Entrez	7031	21784
Ensembl	ENSG00000160182	ENSMUSG00000024032
UniProt	P04155	Q08423
RefSeq (mRNA)	NM_003225	NM_009362
RefSeq (protein)	NP_003216	NP_033388
Location (UCSC)	Chr 21: 42.36 – 42.37 Mb	Chr 17: 31.38 – 31.38 Mb
PubMed search
- Wikidata
View/Edit Human	View/Edit Mouse

Trefoil factor 1 is a protein that in humans is encoded by the TFF1 gene (also called pS2 gene).

== Function ==
Members of the trefoil family are characterized by having at least one copy of the trefoil motif, a 40-amino acid domain that contains three conserved disulfides. They are stable secretory proteins expressed in gastrointestinal mucosa. Their functions are not defined, but they may protect the mucosa from insults, stabilize the mucus layer, and affect healing of the epithelium. This gene, which is expressed in the gastric mucosa, has also been studied because of its expression in human tumors. This gene and two other related trefoil family member genes are found in a cluster on chromosome 21.

=== Glycan binding ===
All three human trefoil factors are lectins that interact specifically with the disaccharide GlcNAc-α-1,4-Gal. This disaccharide is an unusual glycotope that is only known to exist on the large, heavily glycosylated, mucins in the mucosa. By cross-linking mucins through the bivalent binding of this glycotope, the trefoil factors are then able to reversibly modulate the thickness and viscosity of the mucus.

=== In gastric carcinoma ===
TFF1 expression is frequently lost in gastric carcinoma, probably through mechanism of DNA methylation, and it is therefore considered as a tumor suppressor gene.
