= TRNA (cytidine34-2'-O)-methyltransferase =

tRNA (cytidine^{34}-2'-O)-methyltransferase

Identifiers
- EC no.: 2.1.1.207

Databases
- IntEnz: IntEnz view
- BRENDA: BRENDA entry
- ExPASy: NiceZyme view
- KEGG: KEGG entry
- MetaCyc: metabolic pathway
- PRIAM: profile
- PDB structures: RCSB PDB PDBe PDBsum
Search
- PMC: articles
- PubMed: articles
- NCBI: proteins

tRNA (cytidine^{34}-2'-O)-methyltransferase (EC 2.1.1.207, yibK (gene), methyltransferase yibK, TrmL, tRNA methyltransferase L, tRNA (cytidine^{34/5}-carboxymethylaminomethyluridine^{34}-2'-O)-methyltransferase) is an enzyme with systematic name S-adenosyl-L-methionine:tRNA (cytidine^{34/5}-carboxymethylaminomethyluridine^{34}-2'-O)-methyltransferase. This enzyme catalyses the following chemical reaction

(1) S-adenosyl-L-methionine + cytidine^{34} in tRNA $\rightleftharpoons$ S-adenosyl-L-homocysteine + 2'-O-methylcytidine^{34} in tRNA
(2) S-adenosyl-L-methionine + 5-carboxymethylaminomethyluridine^{34} in tRNALeu $\rightleftharpoons$ S-adenosyl-L-homocysteine + 5-carboxymethylaminomethyl-2'-O-methyluridine^{34} in tRNALeu

The enzyme from Escherichia coli catalyses the 2'-O-methylation of cytidine or 5-carboxymethylaminomethyluridine at the wobble position at nucleotide 34 in tRNALeuCmAA and tRNALeucmnm5UmAA.
