= Trefoil factor 2 =

Protein-coding gene in the species Homo sapiens

TFF2
Available structures
PDB	Ortholog search: PDBe RCSB
PDB	List of PDB id codes 2DYZ, 2DZ0, 2DZ1

Identifiers
- Aliases: TFF2, SML1, SP, trefoil factor 2
- External IDs: OMIM: 182590; MGI: 1306805; HomoloGene: 3956; GeneCards: TFF2; OMA:TFF2 - orthologs

Gene location (Human)
Chr.	Chromosome 21 (human)
Band	21q22.3	Start	42,346,357 bp
Band	21q22.3	End	42,350,997 bp

Gene location (Mouse)
Chr.	Chromosome 17 (mouse)
Band	17 A3.3|17 15.8 cM	Start	31,360,023 bp
Band	17 A3.3|17 15.8 cM	End	31,363,256 bp
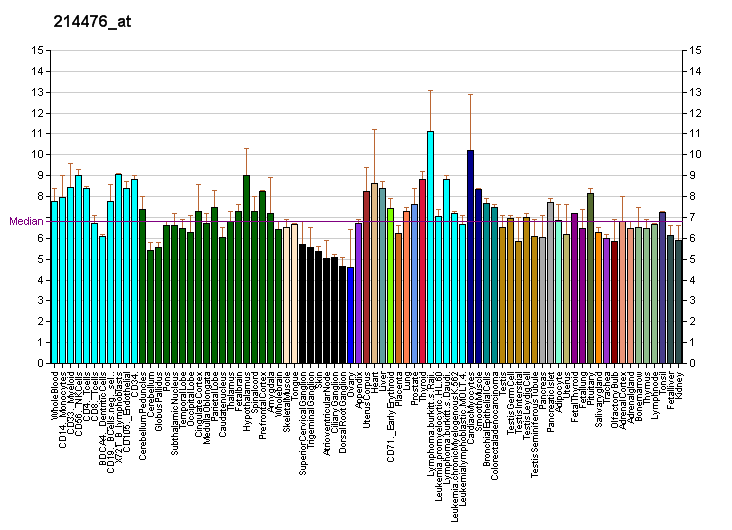
RNA expression pattern
Bgee	Human / Mouse (ortholog); Top expressed in: pancreatic ductal cell; gastric mucosa; pylorus; gallbladder; body of stomach; gonad; duodenum; fundus; islet of Langerhans; cardia / Top expressed in: mucous cell of stomach; epithelium of stomach; pyloric antrum; duodenum; islet of Langerhans; trachea; gallbladder; respiratory epithelium; olfactory epithelium; embryo; More reference expression data
BioGPS	More reference expression data
Gene ontology
Molecular function	protein binding; CXCR4 chemokine receptor binding
Cellular component	extracellular region; extracellular space
Biological process	wound healing; maintenance of gastrointestinal epithelium; negative regulation of gastric acid secretion; chemokine-mediated signaling pathway
Sources:Amigo / QuickGO
Orthologs
Species	Human	Mouse
Entrez	7032	21785
Ensembl	ENSG00000160181	ENSMUSG00000024028
UniProt	Q03403	Q03404; Q9QX97
RefSeq (mRNA)	NM_005423	NM_009363
RefSeq (protein)	NP_005414	NP_033389
Location (UCSC)	Chr 21: 42.35 – 42.35 Mb	Chr 17: 31.36 – 31.36 Mb
PubMed search
- Wikidata
View/Edit Human	View/Edit Mouse

Trefoil factor 2 is a protein that in humans is encoded by the TFF2 gene.

Members of the trefoil family are characterized by having at least one copy of the trefoil motif, a 40-amino acid domain that contains three conserved disulfides. They are stable secretory proteins expressed in gastrointestinal mucosa. Their functions are not defined, but they may protect the mucosa from insults, stabilize the mucus layer and affect healing of the epithelium. The encoded protein inhibits gastric acid secretion. This gene and two other related trefoil family member genes are found in a cluster on chromosome 21.

== Glycan binding ==
All human trefoil factors are lectins that interact specifically with the disaccharide GlcNAc-α-1,4-Gal. This disaccharide is an unusual glycotope that is only known to exist on the large, heavily glycosylated, mucins in the mucosa. By cross-linking mucins through the bivalent binding of this glycotope, the trefoil factors are then able to reversible modulate the thickness and viscosity of the mucus.
