= Celtic knot =

Decorative knot used extensively in the Celtic style of Insular art

One very basic form of Celtic or pseudo-Celtic linear knotwork.

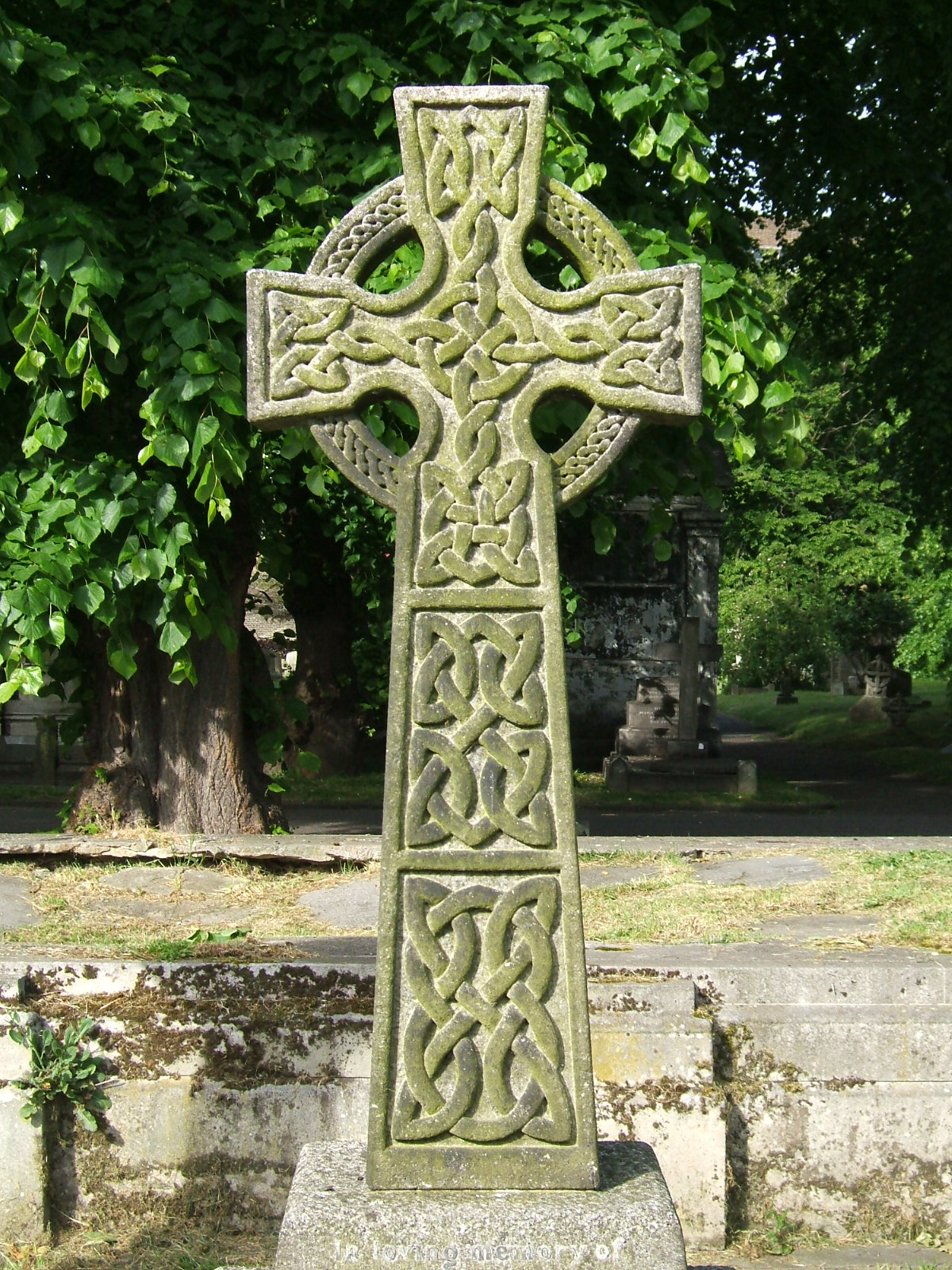
Stone Celtic crosses, such as this, are a major source of knowledge regarding Celtic knot design.

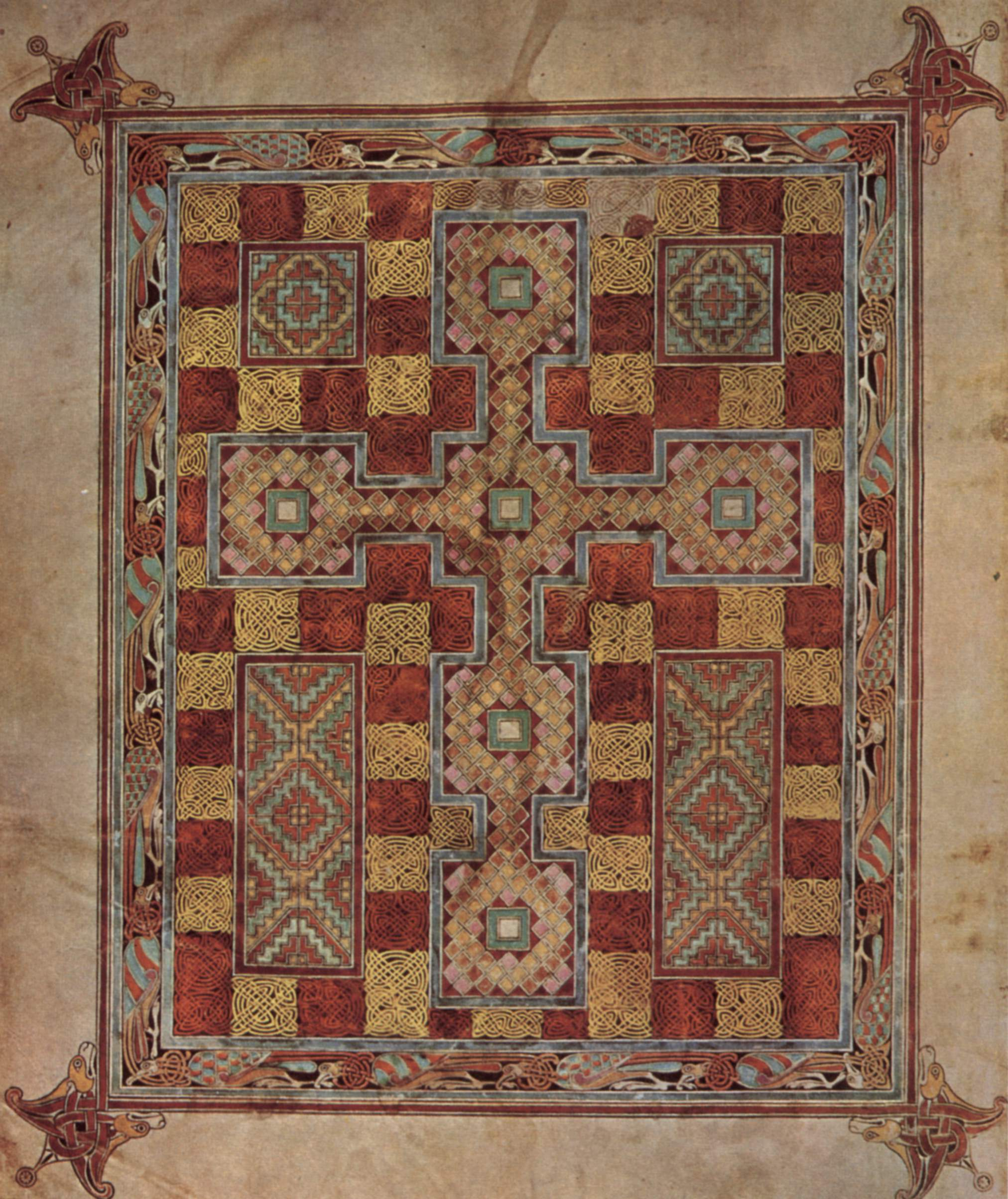
Carpet page from Lindisfarne Gospels, showing knotwork detail.

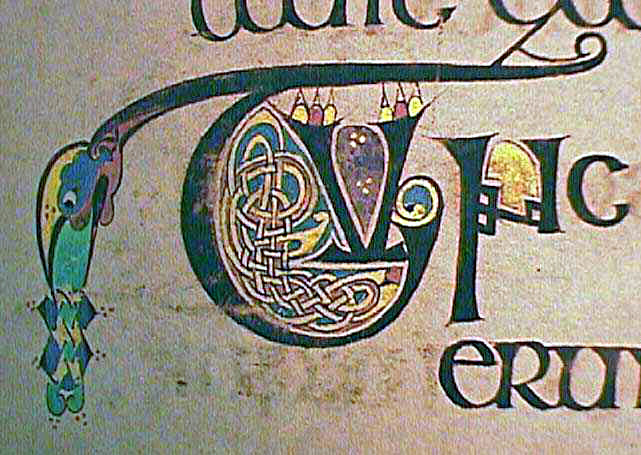
Almost all of the folios of the Book of Kells contain small illuminations like this decorated initial.

Celtic knots (Irish: snaidhm Cheilteach, Welsh: cwlwm Celtaidd, Cornish: kolm Keltek, Scottish Gaelic: snaidhm Ceilteach) are a variety of knots and stylized graphical representations of knots used for decoration, used extensively in the Celtic and Northumbrian styles of Insular art. These knots are most known for their adaptation for use in the ornamentation of Christian monuments and manuscripts, such as the 8th-century St. Teilo Gospels, the Book of Kells and the Lindisfarne Gospels. Most are endless knots, and many are varieties of basket weave knots.

== History ==
The use of interlace patterns had its origins in the late Roman Empire. Knot patterns first appeared in the third and fourth centuries AD and can be seen in Roman floor mosaics of that time. Interesting developments in the artistic use of interlaced knot patterns are found in Byzantine architecture and book illumination, Coptic art, Celtic art, Islamic art, Kievan Rus' book illumination, Ethiopian art, and European architecture and book illumination.

Spirals, step patterns, and key patterns are dominant motifs in Celtic art before the Christian influence on the Celts, which began around 450. These designs found their way into early Christian manuscripts and artwork with the addition of depictions from life, such as animals, plants and even humans. In the beginning, the patterns were intricate interwoven cords, called plaits, which can also be found in other areas of Europe, such as Italy, in the 6th century. A fragment of a Gospel Book, now in the Durham Cathedral library and created in northern Britain in the 7th century, contains the earliest example of true knotted designs in the Celtic manner.

Examples of plait work (featuring designs of woven, unbroken cord) predate knotwork designs in several cultures around the world, but the broken and reconnected plait work that is characteristic of true knotwork began in northern Italy and southern Gaul and spread to Ireland by the 7th century. The style is most commonly associated with the Celtic lands and England (particularly the Kingdom of Northumbria) and was then exported to Europe by Irish and Northumbrian monastic activities on the continent. J. Romilly Allen has identified "eight elementary knots which form the basis of nearly all the interlaced patterns in Celtic decorative art".

The Celtic knot as a tattoo design became popular in the United States in the 1970s and 1980s.

== Examples ==
Examples of Celtic knots
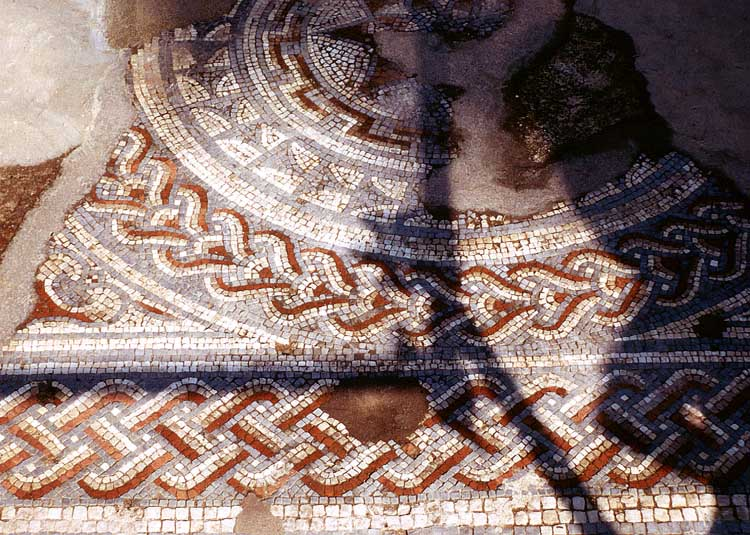
A small part of The Great Pavement, a Roman mosaic laid in AD 325 at Woodchester, Gloucestershire, England

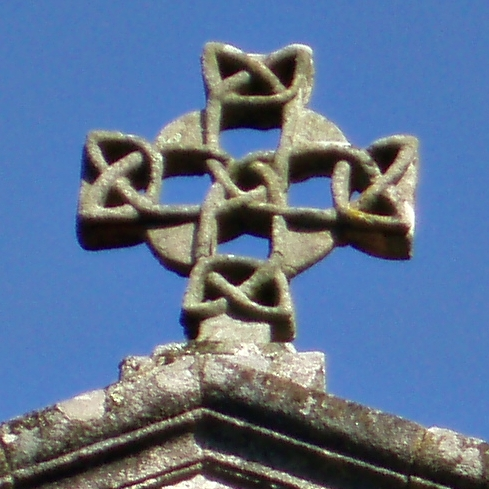
Romanesque cross atop the church of St. Susanna, Santiago de Compostela, Galicia

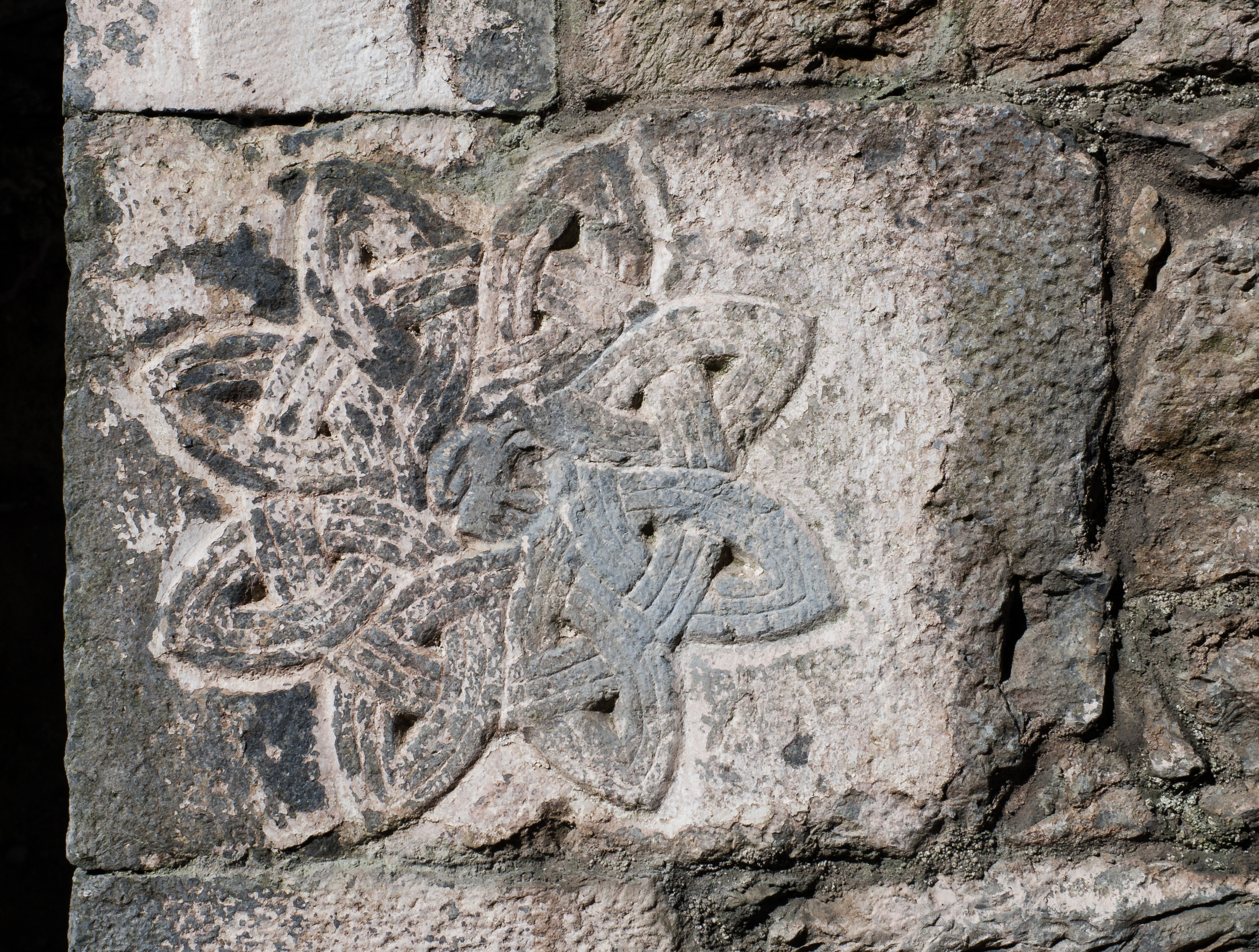
Cahir Abbey, c. 15th century

Design influenced by illustration in the Lindisfarne Gospels

A basic form of a Celtic knotwork cross

Ornamental version of Celtic "high cross" with decorative knotwork

A quasi-Celtic cross made of a large symmetrical knot with a circle interlaced through its center

This knotwork by Steve Ball illustrates King Crimson's Discipline and is the logo of Discipline Global Mobile

Slightly modified version of quasi-Celtic knot

Triquetra knot

== See also ==
- Celtic art
- Celtic button knot
- Celtic cross
- Croatian interlace
- Endless knot
- George Bain (artist)
- Islamic interlace patterns
- Khachkars
- Knot garden
- Knot (mathematics)
- Oseberg style
- Triquetra
- Turk's head knot
