= Celtic maze =

Straight-line spiral patterns dating to prehistoric times

Celtic mazes are straight-line spiral key patterns that have been drawn all over the world since prehistoric times. The patterns originate in early Celtic developments in stone and metal-work, and later in medieval Insular art. Prehistoric spiral designs date back to Gavrinis (c. 3500 BCE).

Celtic spiral tile pattern found in many locations including The Book of Kells

The straight-line spirals of Celtic labyrinths originated in chevrons and lozenges and are drawn by the Celts using a connect the dots method.

== See also ==
- Celtic knot
- Labyrinth
- Maze, whose technical definition does not include "Celtic mazes"
- Spirangle
