= Carrick bend =

Type of knot

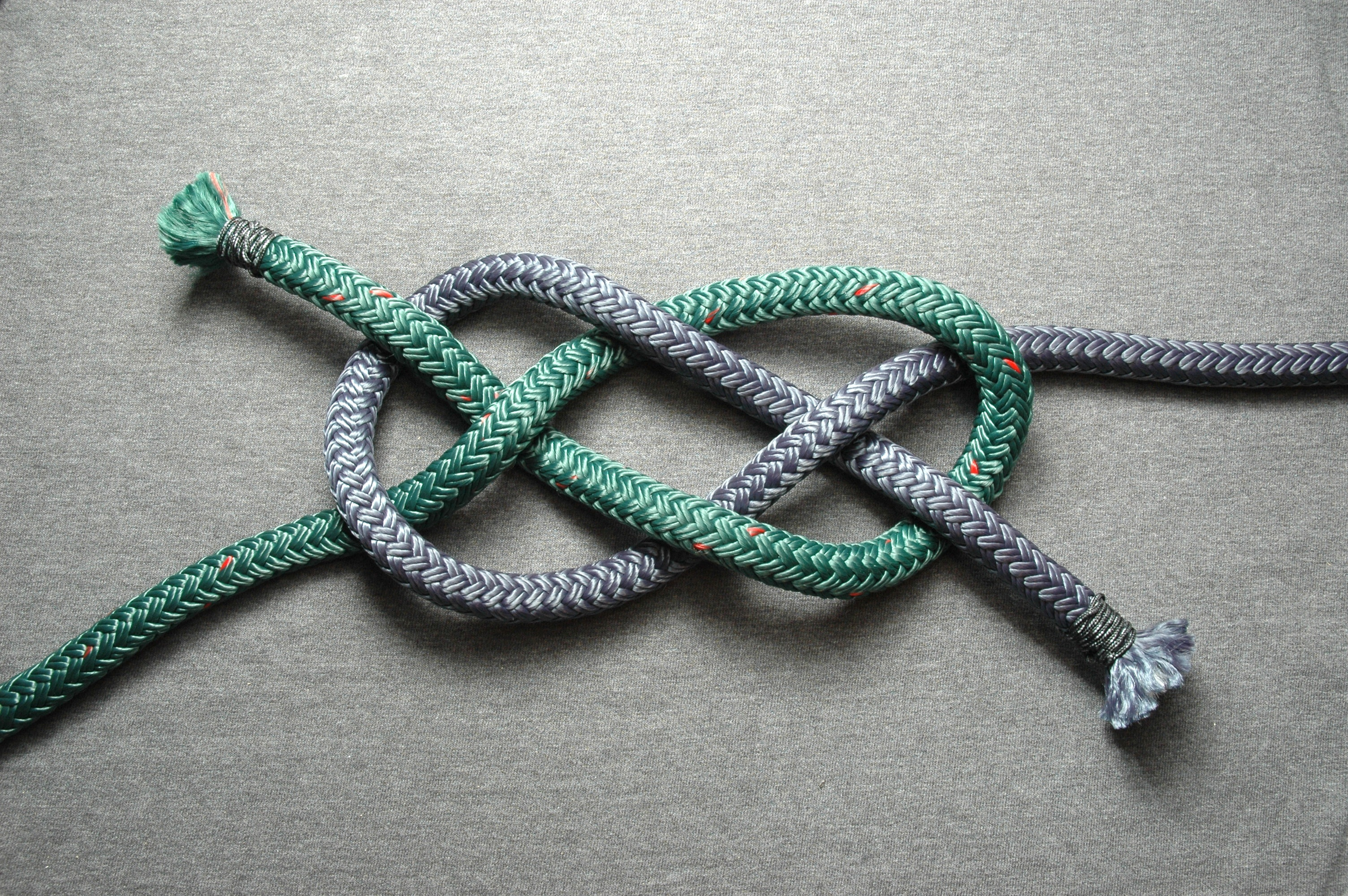
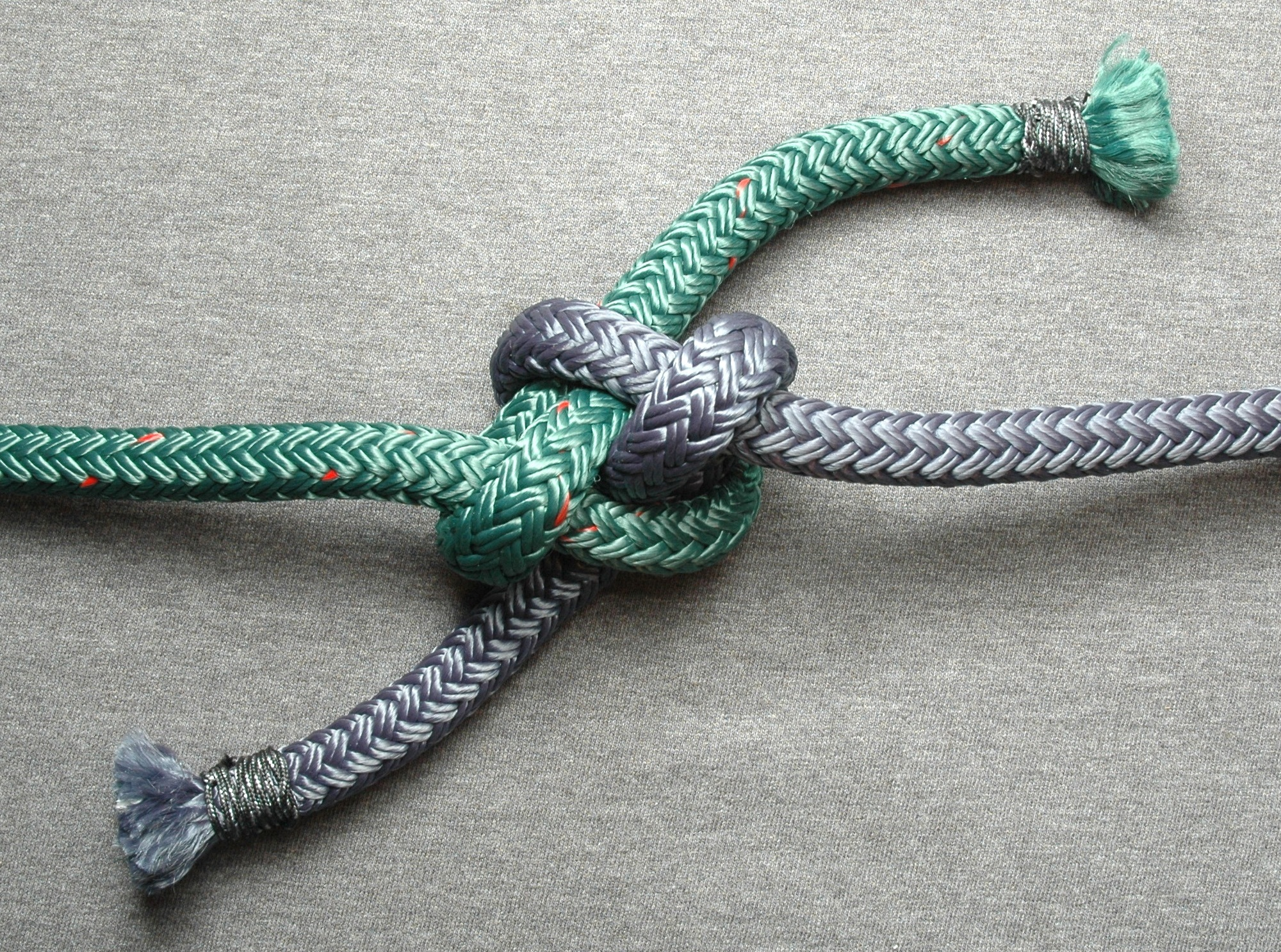
- Top - A fully interwoven diagonally opposed carrick bend Bottom - capsized
- Names: Carrick bend, Double carrick bend, Double coin knot, Ten accord knot, Bosun's knot, Basketweave knot, Chinese knot, Josephine knot, Whistle lanyard, Sailor's breastplate knot, Sailors knot, Pretzel knot, Wake knot
- Category: Bend
- Related: Single carrick bend, Diamond knot, Carrick mat
- Releasing: Non-jamming
- ABoK: #1428, #1439

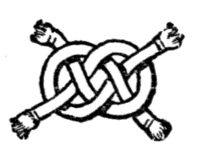
Wake or Ormonde knot of heraldry

The Carrick bend, also known as the Sailor's breastplate, is a knot used for joining two lines. It is particularly appropriate for very heavy rope or cable that is too large and stiff to be easily formed into other common bends. It will not jam even after carrying a significant load or being soaked with water.

As with many other members of the basket weave knot family, the carrick bend's aesthetically pleasing interwoven and symmetrical shape has also made it popular for decorative purposes.

== Heraldry ==
The Carrick bend is known as the "Wake knot" or "Ormonde knot" when it is used as a heraldic badge.

== Etymology ==
This knot's name dates back to at least 1783, when it was included in a nautical bilingual dictionary authored by Daniel Lescallier. Its origins prior to that are not known with certainty. There are several possible explanations for the name "Carrick" being associated with this bend. The Elizabethan era plasterwork of Ormonde Castle in Carrick-on-Suir shows numerous carrick bends molded in relief. Or the name may come from Carrick Roads—a large natural anchorage by Falmouth in Cornwall, England. The name may also have been derived from the Carrack, a medieval type of ship.

== Variations ==
The eight crossings within the carrick bend allow for many similar-looking knots to be made. The lines in a "full" or "true" carrick bend alternate between over and under at every crossing. There are also two ways the ends can emerge from the knot: diagonally opposed or from the same side. The latter form is also called the double coin knot. The form with the ends emerging diagonally opposed is considered more secure.

Unfortunately, with so many permutations, the carrick bend is prone to being tied incorrectly.

== Appearance ==
The carrick bend, also called full carrick bend, sailor's knot, and anchor bend, is perhaps the nearest thing we have to a perfect bend. It is symmetrical, it is easy to tie, it does not slip easily in wet material, it is among the strongest of knots, it cannot jam and is readily untied. To offset this array of excellencies is the sole objection that it is somewhat bulky.

— The Ashley Book of Knots

=== Capsized ===
Complete capsizing requires a loose weave.

The carrick bend is generally tied in a flat interwoven form as shown above. Without additional measures it will collapse into a different shape when tightened, a process known as capsizing, with the degree of capsizing depending on the looseness of the weave. This capsized form is both secure and stable once tightened, although it is bulkier than the seized form below. Incomplete capsizing resulting from a tight weave produces a form that is likewise secure and stable, but which is more difficult to untie, countering one of the advantages of the carrick bend. When the knot is allowed to capsize naturally under tension, considerable slippage of line through the knot can occur before tightening, so the knot should be set carefully before loading to avoid this slippage in use.

=== Seized ===
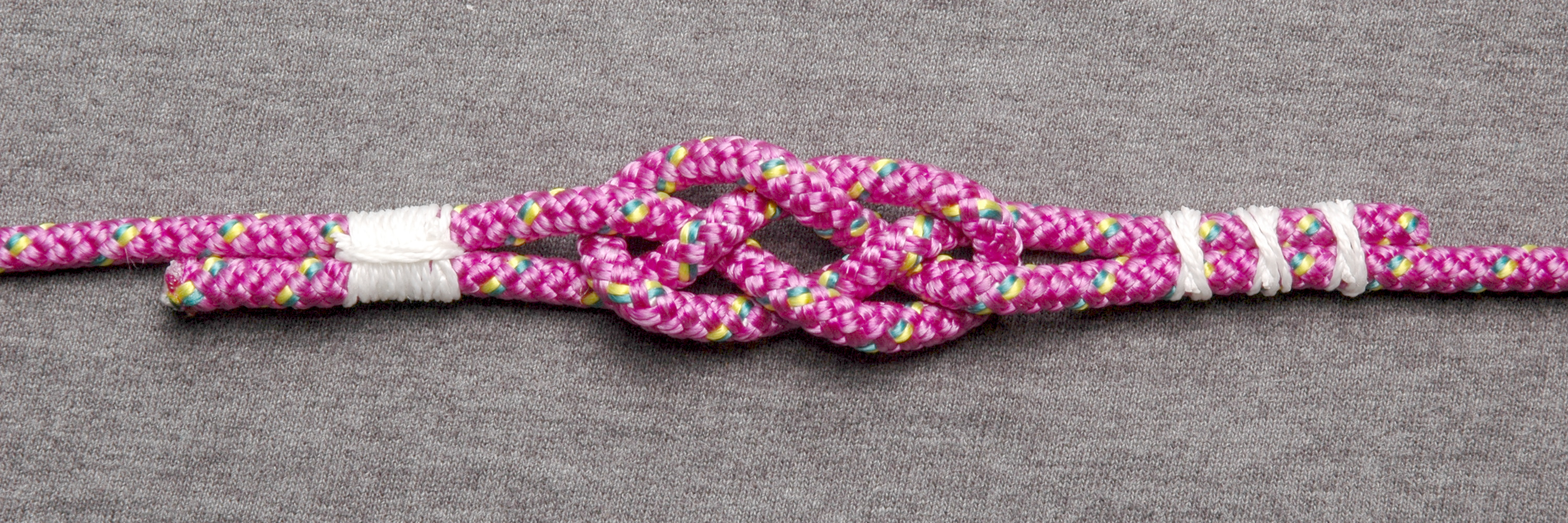
Seized carrick bend. The seizings preserve the initial shape of the knot.

In the interest of making the carrick bend easier to untie, especially when tied in extremely large rope, the ends may be seized to prevent the knot from collapsing when load is applied. This practice also keeps the knot's profile flatter and can ease its passage over capstans or winches.

The ends are traditionally seized to their standing part using a round seizing. For expediency, a series of double constrictor knots, drawn very tight, may also be used. When seizing the carrick bend, both ends must be secured to their standing parts or the bend will slip.

== Decorative uses ==
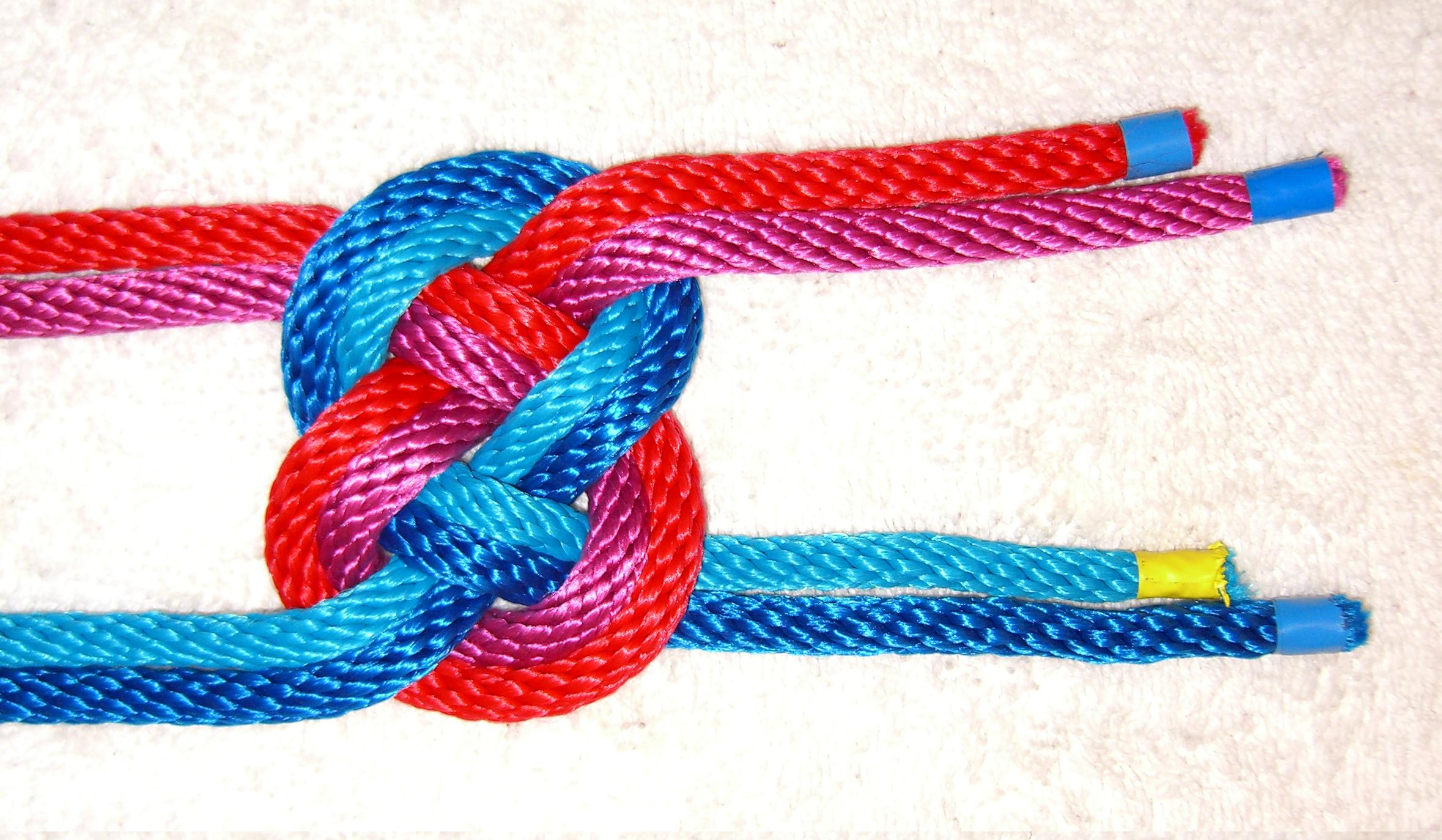
Decorative form made with doubled lines

In the decorative variation, both standing ends enter from one side and both working ends exit from the other. In this configuration, the knot is known as the Josephine knot (macrame) or double coin knot (Chinese knotting). This form of the carrick bend is found depicted in heraldry, sometimes with the tails of heraldic serpents woven (or "nowed") into this knot. In heraldry, the knot is associated with Hereward the Wake and is known under the name Wake knot. It is depicted in the coat of arms of Bourne Town Council, Lincolnshire.

The knot can be tied using doubled lines for an even flatter, more elaborate appearance. A doubled carrick bend was used to ornamentally secure the lanyards on the breastplate of the US Navy Mark V diving helmet during inspection and between dives.

When the ends of the carrick bend are connected together, or more practically hidden behind the knot, it becomes a carrick mat. This same configuration is also one of the most basic Turk's head knots.

== Security ==
The fully interwoven diagonal carrick bend is the most secure variation. All other forms are inferior and not recommended as bends.

Although the carrick bend has a reputation for strength, some tests have shown it to be as weak as 65% efficiency.

== See also ==
- List of bend knots
- List of knots
