= Single carrick bend =

Type of knot

One of many 'single carrick' bends
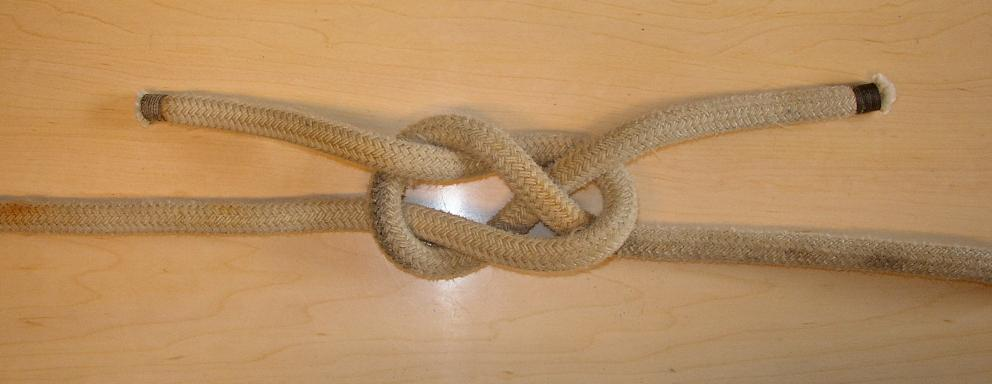
- Category: Bend
- Related: Carrick bend
- Typical use: Large rope

The name single carrick bend has been used and even recommended by many different people to refer to different knots with a similar general form to the carrick bend. All of these knots are weaker and less secure for the purpose of a bend which is the connection of two rope ends. Several have other properties which make them desirable for specific uses.

Knots carrying the name single carrick bend can be characterised as being able to be arranged flat so that they look the same as the carrick bend except for variations in which ropes go under which at the intersections.

Knots which have been called single carrick bend in various knotting books include the reef knot, the sheet bend, the granny knot, the thief knot, and even several arrangements that fail to form a knot at all, and simply fall apart.

== See also ==
- List of bend knots
- List of knots
