= Basket weave knot =

Style of knot

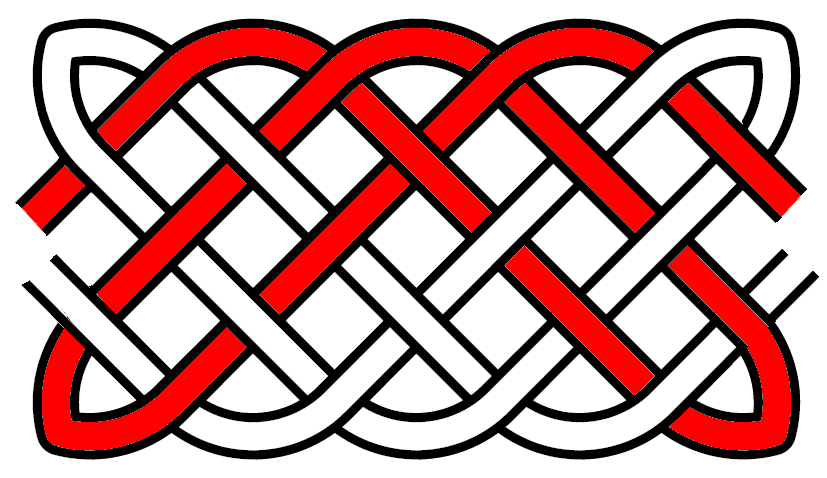
A diagram of a basket weave knot on a 3×5 rectangular grid

The basket weave knots are a family of bend and lanyard knots with a regular pattern of over–one, under–one. All of these knots are rectangular and lie in a plane. They are named after plait-woven baskets, which have a similar appearance.

== Construction ==
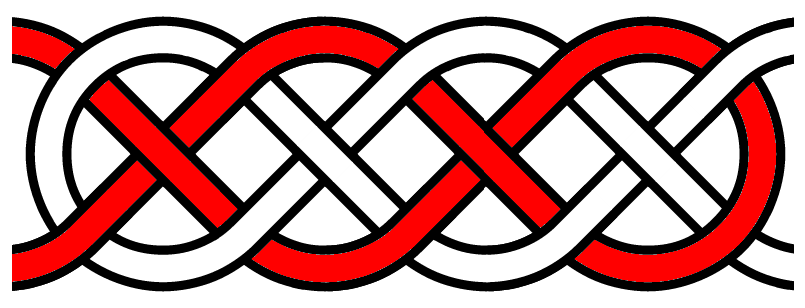
A diagram of a long basket weave knot on a 2×5 grid

A basket weave knot is made up of two sets of parallel lines drawn inside a rectangle such that the lines meet at the edges of the rectangle. For a true basket weave knot that can be tied with two strands, the number of intersections in each direction cannot have a common divisor. Within this constraint, there is no theoretical upper limit to the size of a basket weave knot. Thus, a knot that has two intersections in one direction can be lengthened with any odd number in the perpendicular direction. If the dimension n in the smaller direction is odd, it is always possible to construct a knot with n + 2 intersections in the other dimension. However, large basket weave knots have a tendency to twist and curl because they are completely flat.

A basket weave knot can be tied from a single strand by first forming a bight in the middle of the line. The ends near the bight become the standing ends. This method will keep the knot in one plane only for knots in which the standing ends enter the same side; these knots are called bosun's knots because they can be tied in a lanyard. For knots in which the standing ends enter from different sides of the rectangle, the bight will wrap across one side of the knot after it is set.

Any basket weave knot that can be tied from two strands can be drawn as an endless knot by connecting the standing ends together and the working ends together. An example of this can be seen in the carrick mat.

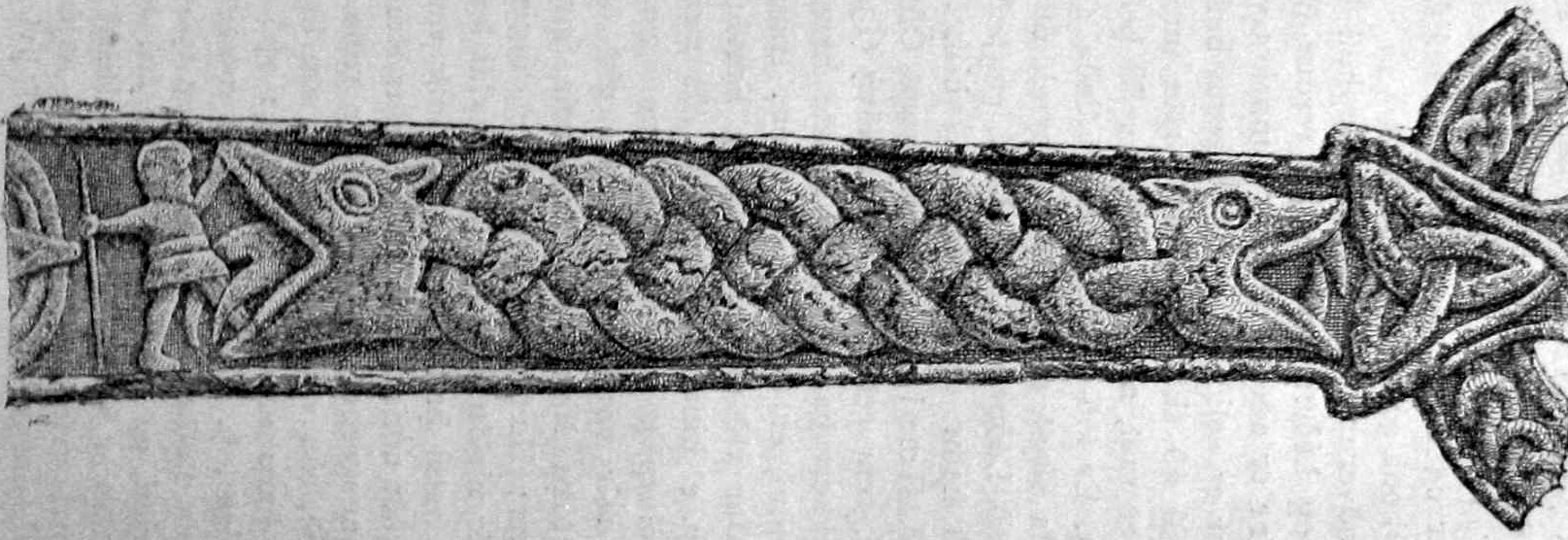
A decorative use on the Gosforth Cross, from the 10th century AD

If a basket weave knot is tied with a flat line such as ribbon instead of a round line such as rope or cord, the method of turning the line at the edges affects the final appearance. Deflecting the line will form a series of bights or scallops along the edge, while folding it over will leave the edge flat.

== Examples ==
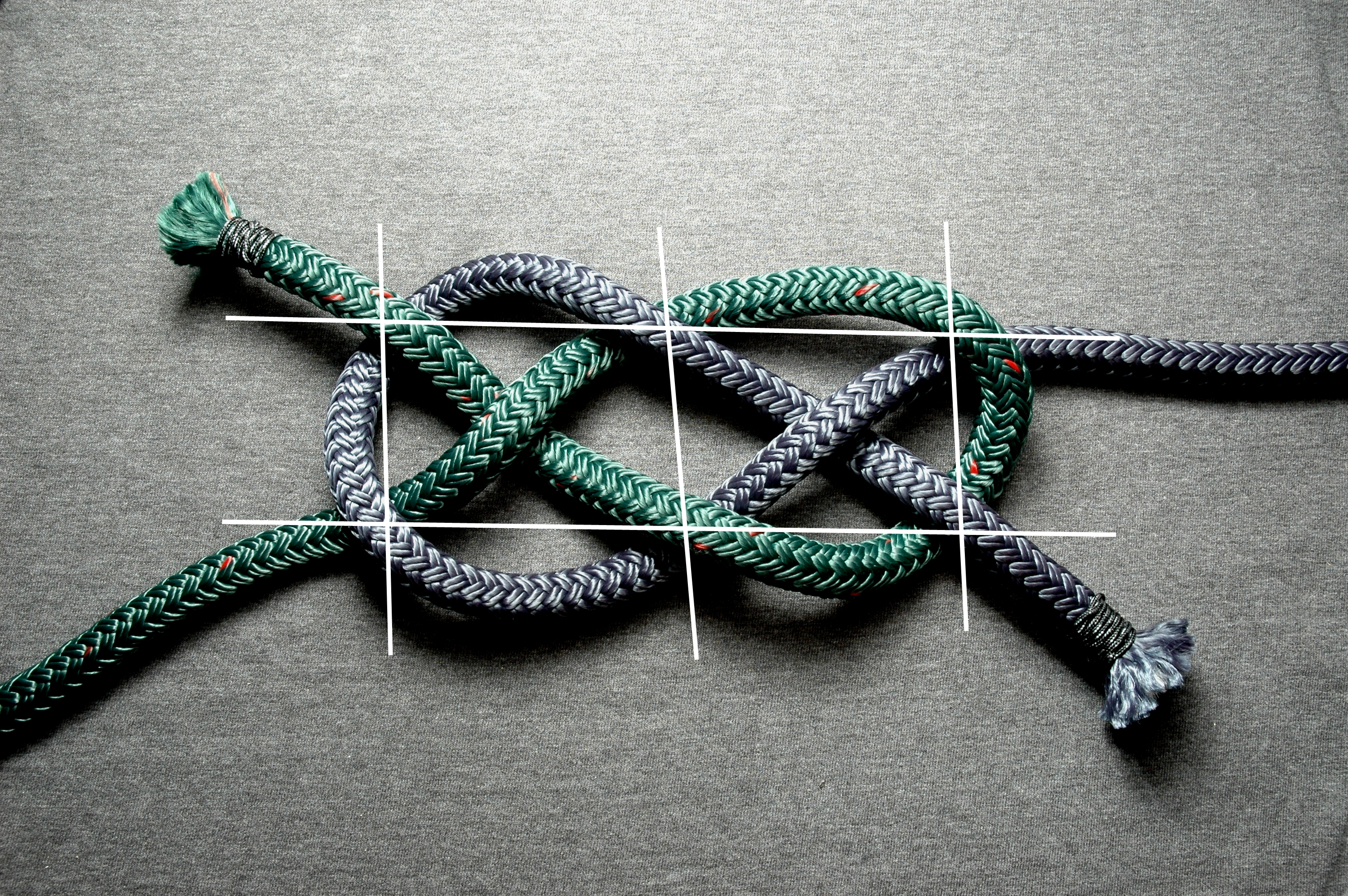
A carrick bend knot with a 2×3 rectangular grid superimposed upon it.

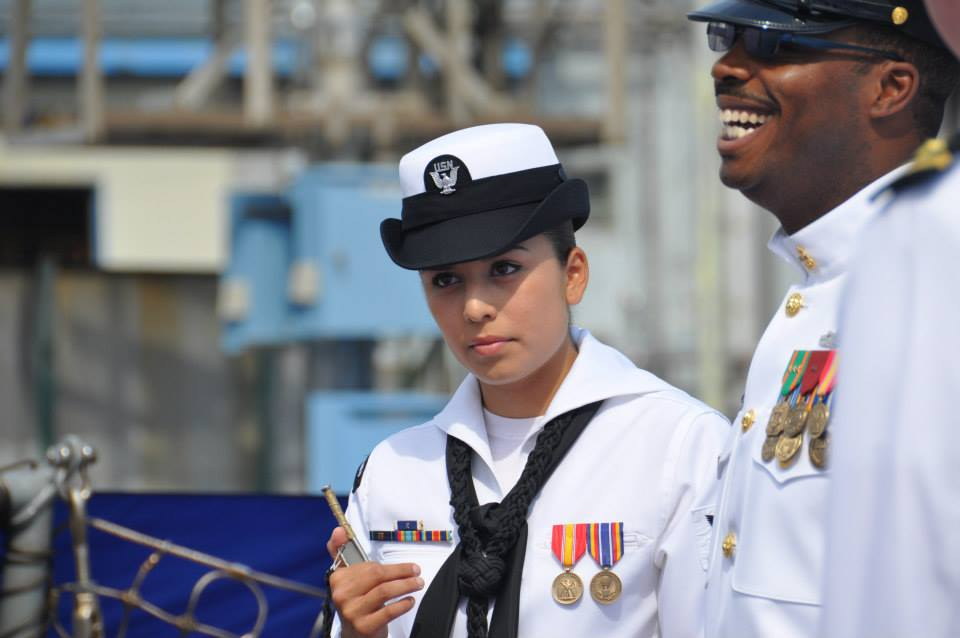
U.S. Navy sailor wearing a boatswain's lanyard.

The simplest basket weave knots consist of a two–by–three rectangle of intersections and include the following:

- Carrick bend
- Double coin knot
- Granny knot

In the granny knot, the standing ends enter the short side, while in the double coin knot, the standing ends enter the long side. Therefore, any of these knots could be used for a lanyard. In the carrick bend, which is otherwise similar to the double coin knot, the standing ends enter opposite long sides.

The next smallest possible basket weave knot is made up of a three–by–four rectangle, and may be called a boatswain's lanyard, whistle lanyard, Napoleon knot, or Chinese knot, although the art of Chinese knotting includes many more knots besides this one.
