= Key pattern =

Type of interlocking geometric motif

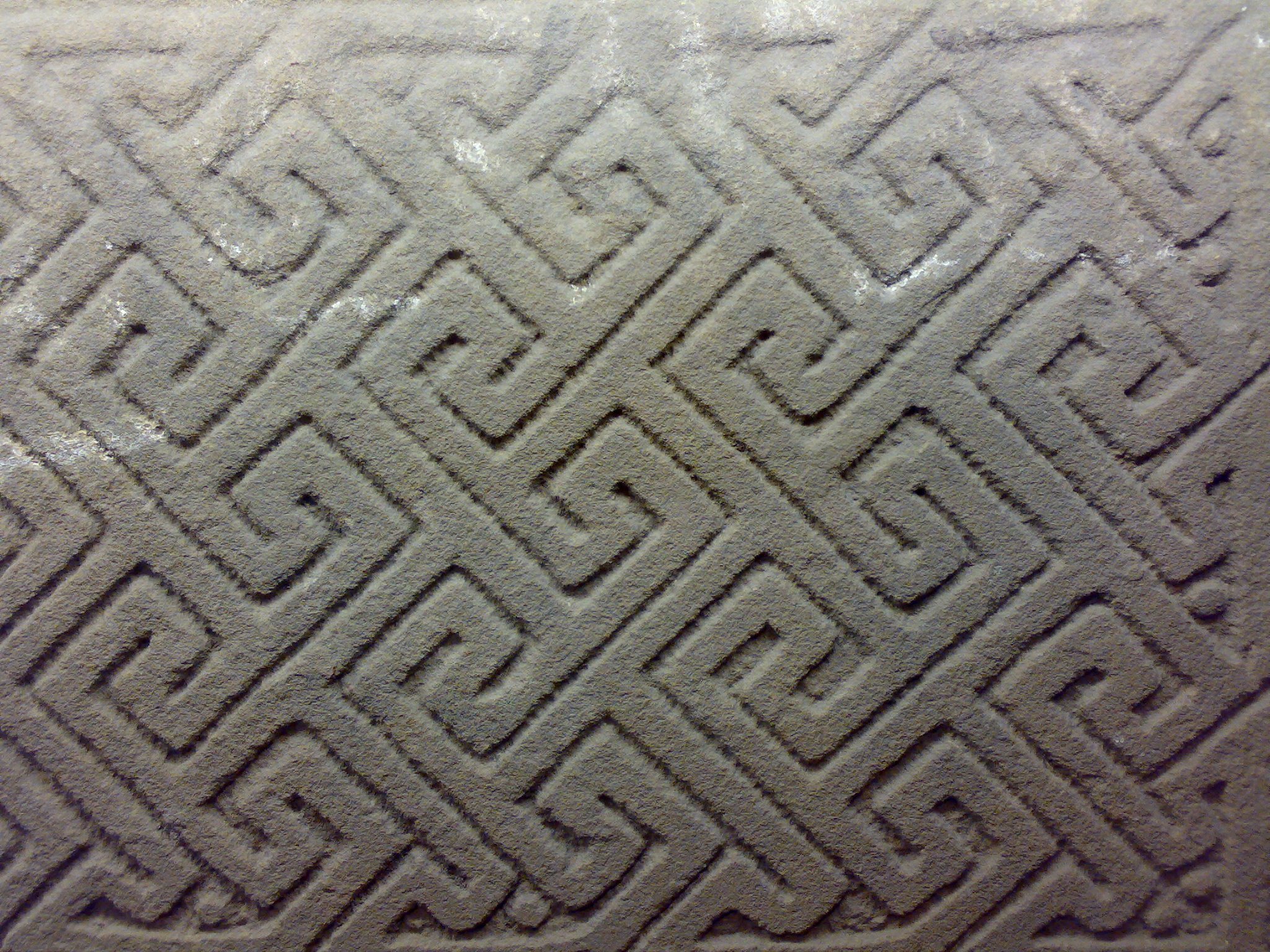
An example of a key pattern in Insular stone art from Groam House, Scotland.

Key pattern is the generic term for an interlocking geometric motif made from straight lines or bars that intersect to form rectilinear spiral shapes. According to Allen and Anderson, the negative space between the lines or bars of a key pattern “resembl[es] the L- or T-shaped slots in an ordinary key to allow it to pass the wards of the lock.”

Key patterns have been discovered and used in ornamentation by a number of global cultures in human history, and are thought to largely have been designed independently of each other. The earliest examples of key patterns are seen in textile ornaments from Mezin, Ukraine, dated to approximately 23,000 B.C. Key patterns were also common in textile and ceramic ornamentation during the Neolithic period, with examples found among archeological discoveries in present-day Fiji, Peru, Mexico, Moldova, Romania, Hungary, Yugoslavia, and Greece, as well as in pre-Christian Celtic art. The oldest known pair of pants, wool trousers found in a grave dated to approximately 1038-926 B.C. in present-day western China, have a decorative band of key patterns woven into them. In addition, extant examples of early medieval Insular art, such as stone decorations and illuminated manuscripts, as well as Japanese, Chinese, and Islamic decorative arts from different periods, feature key patterns.

Celtic mazes, Greek frets, and xicalcoliuhquis are examples of well-known designs that are considered to be key patterns.

== Gallery ==
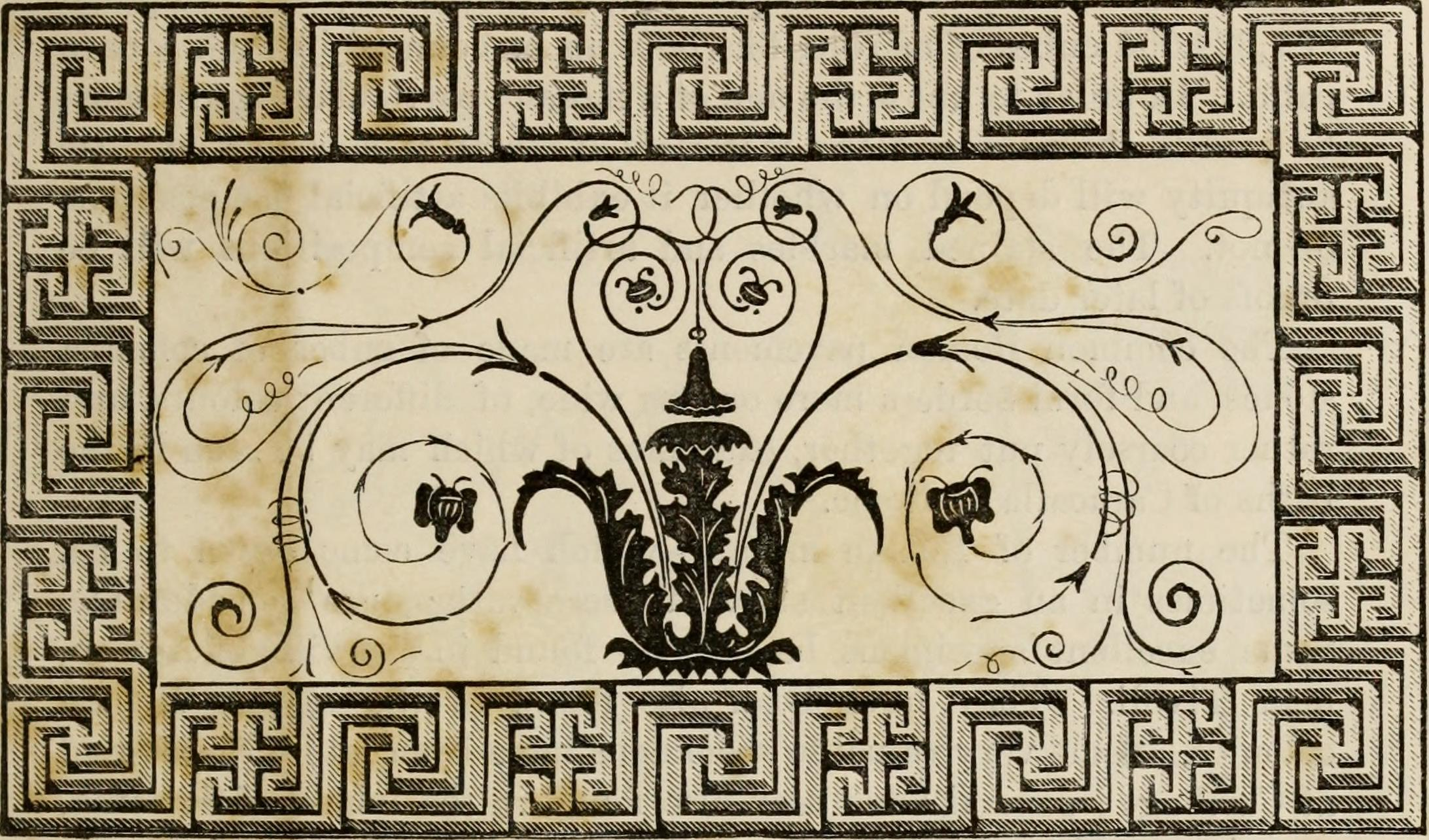
Key patterns forming a border in the Roman Mosaic of Dioscorides as seen in the Handbook of Archaeology, Egyptian - Greek - Etruscan - Roman (1867)

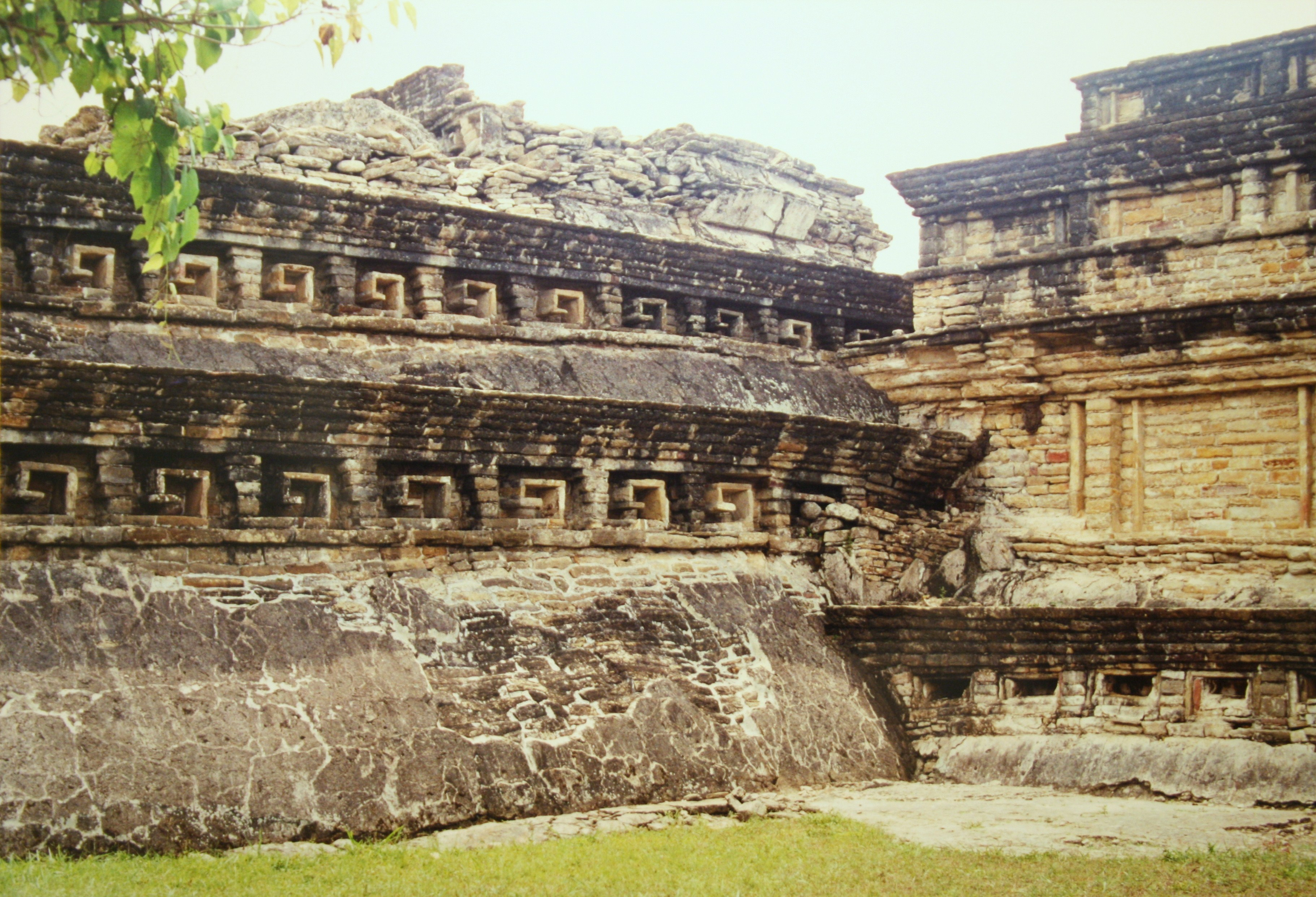
Key patterns seen in architectural details at El Tajín, a pre-Columbian archaeological site in southern Mexico.

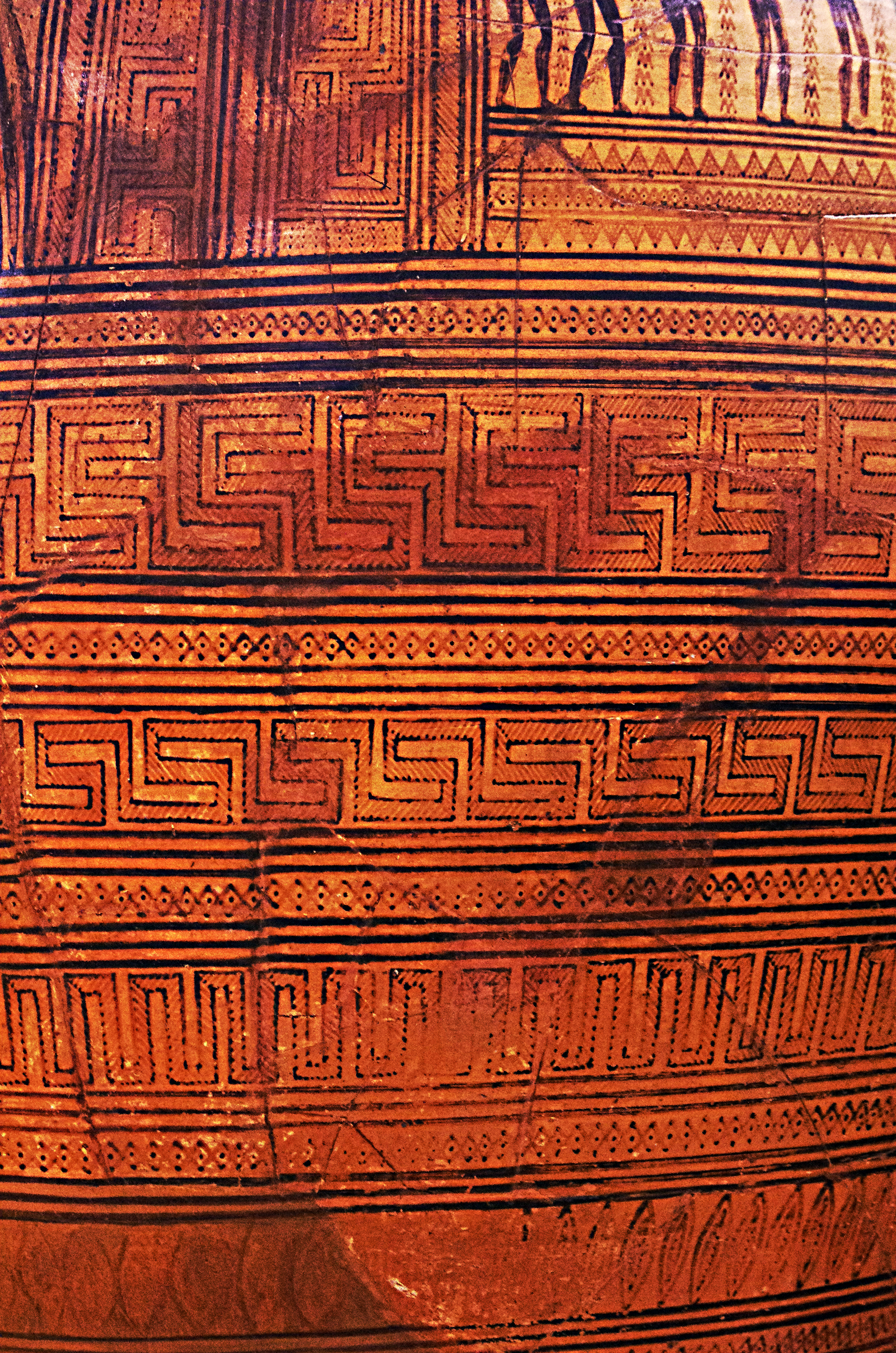
A detail of key patterns from a Greek painted terracotta amphora from 8th century B.C. in the collection of the Archaeological Museum of Athens

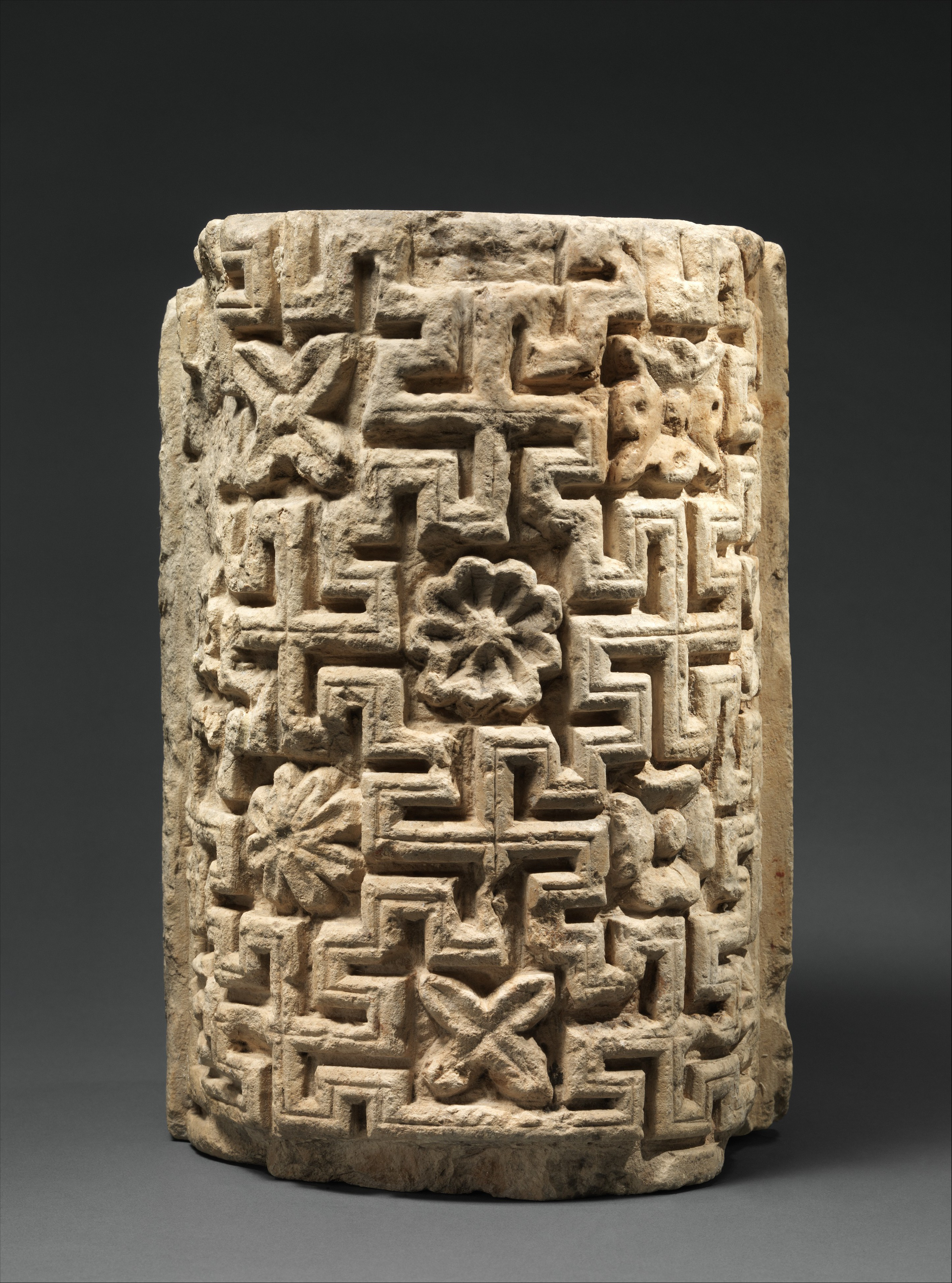
A fragment of an engaged column carved from limestone, with key patterns, rosettes, and acanthus leaves, from a 6th-century monastic community in Bawit, Egypt.

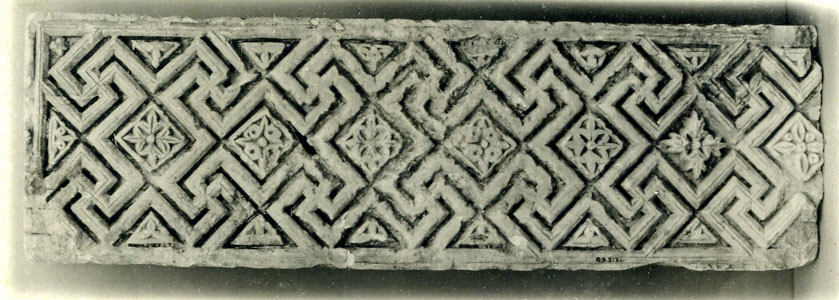
A fragment from a limestone frieze with diagonal key patterns and rosettes from 6th century Byzantine Egypt, in the collection of the Metropolitan Museum of Art.

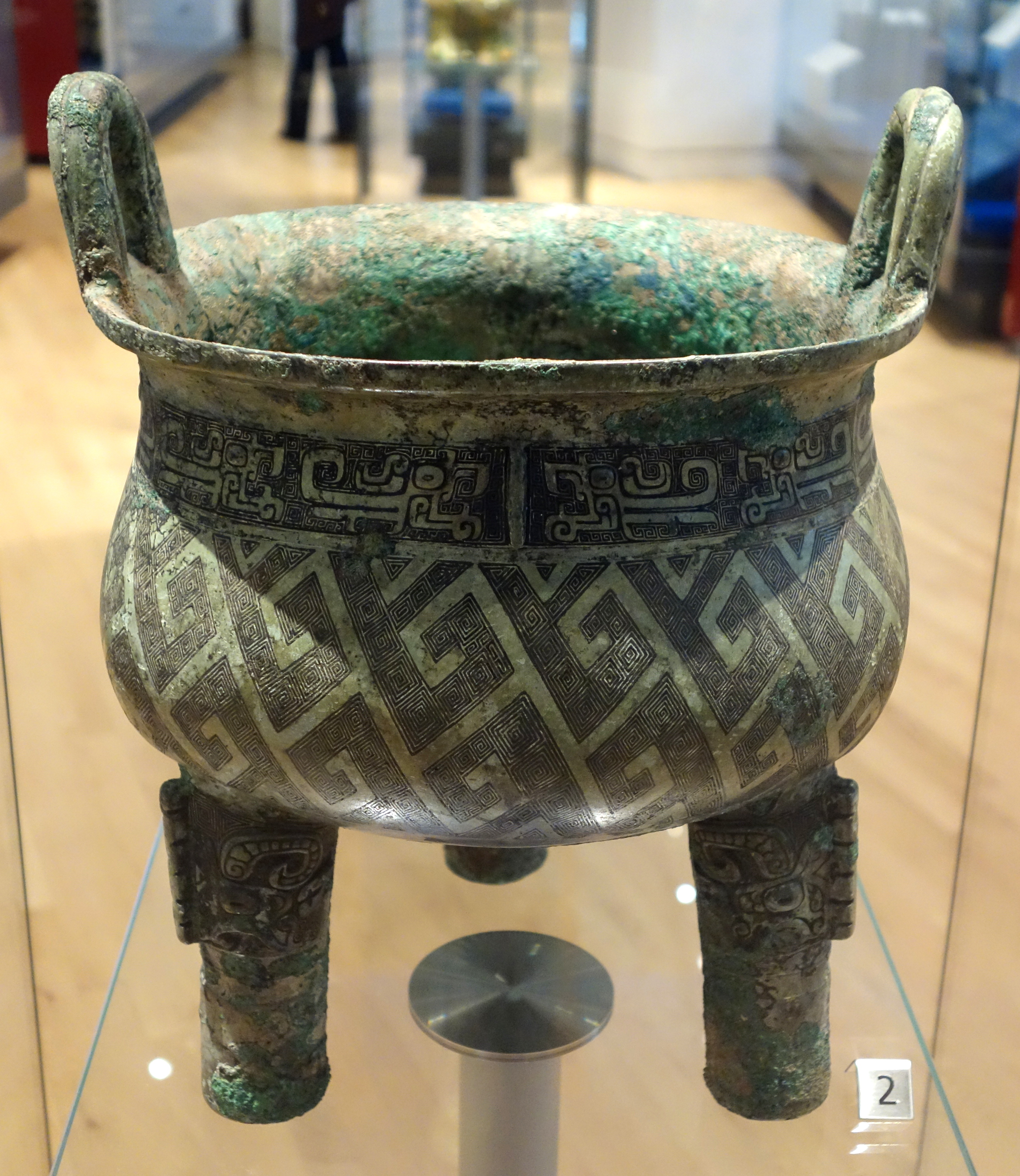
Rectilinear key patterns seen among other ornaments on a bronze Chinese cooking vessel from the Shang dynasty.

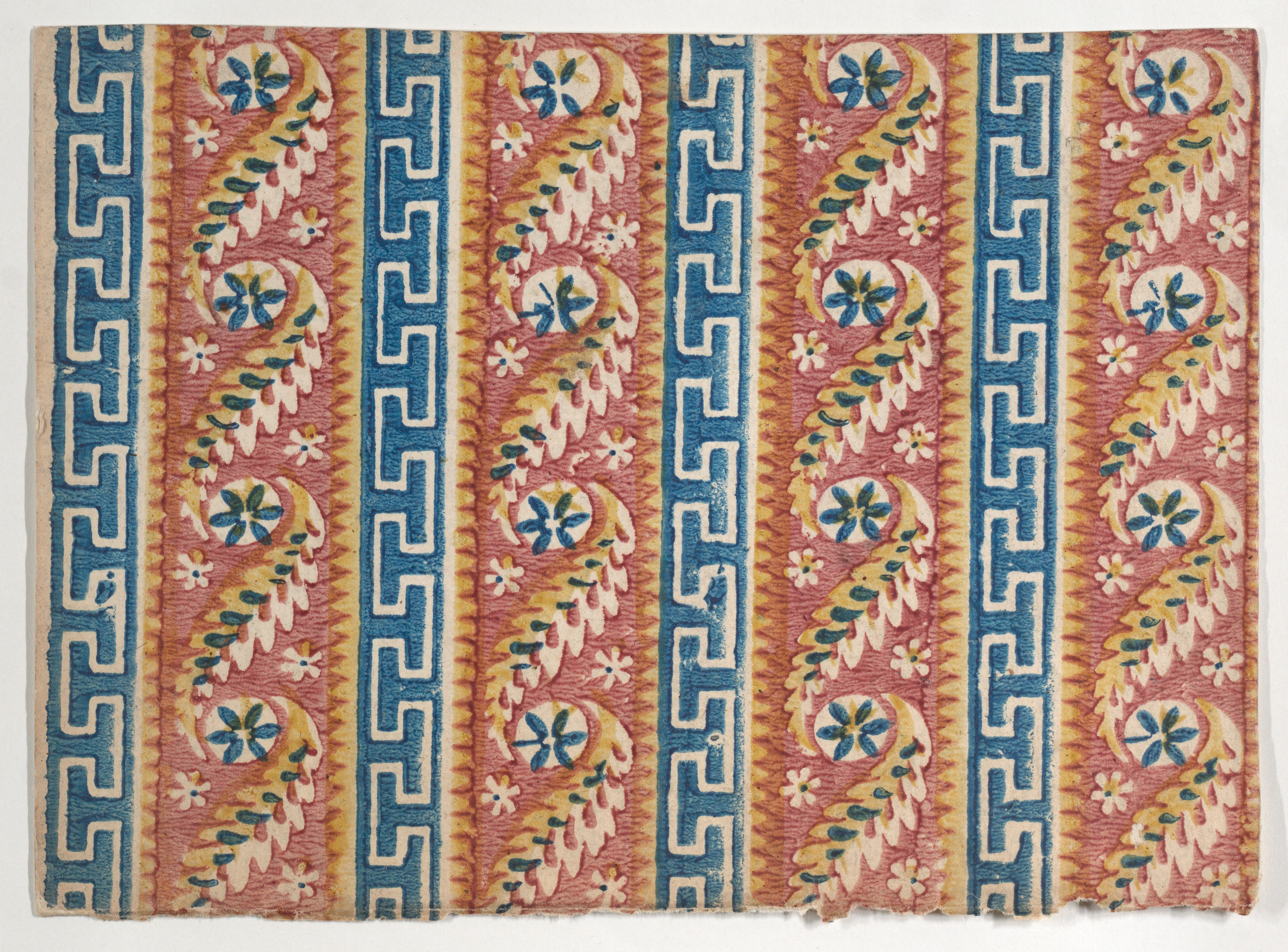
A decorative paper sheet with paisley and Greek key patterns printed in relief from 18th century Italy in the collection of the Metropolitan Museum of Art.

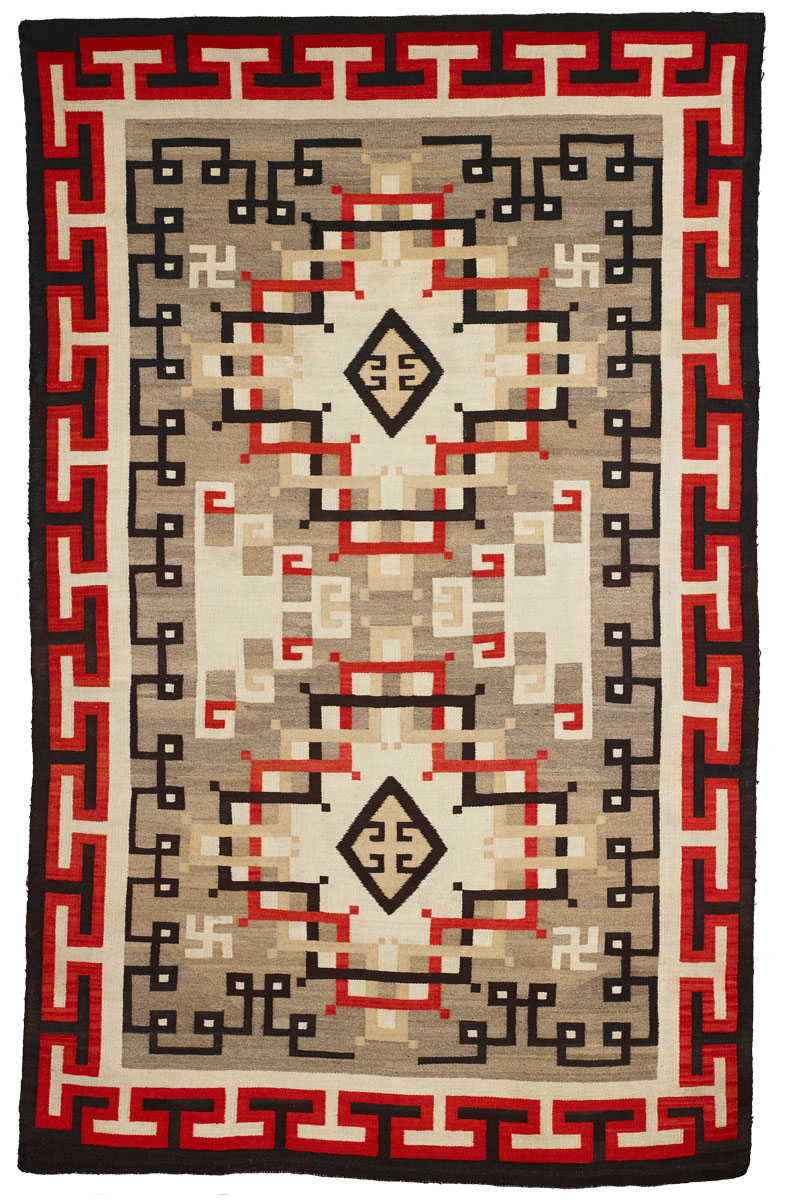
A wool rug ca.1900-1920 from the Navajo people in the Early Crystal style, with key patterns forming the outer border.

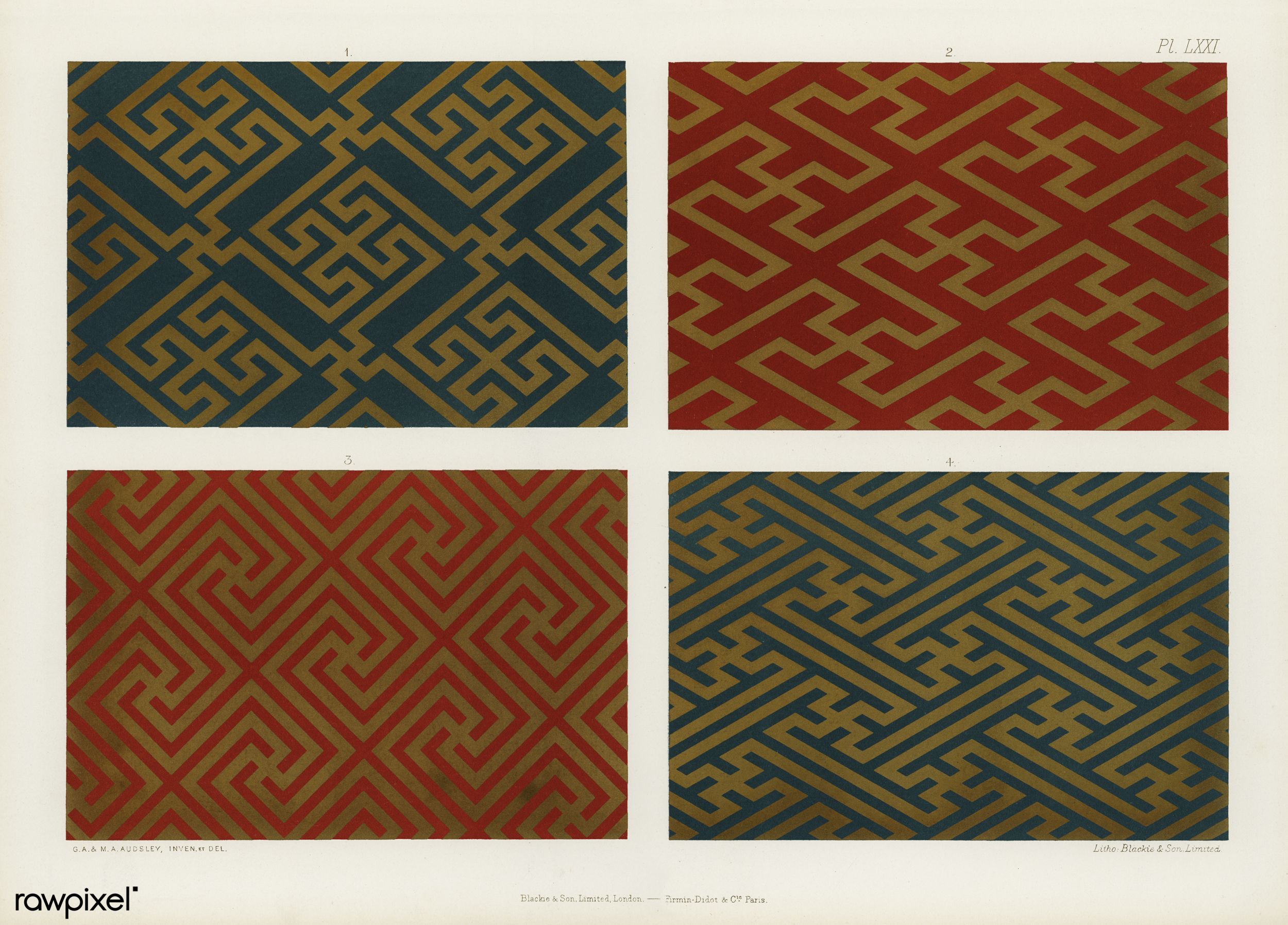
Vintage Japanese designs of key patterns from The Practical Decorator and Ornamentist by G.A & M.A. Audsley

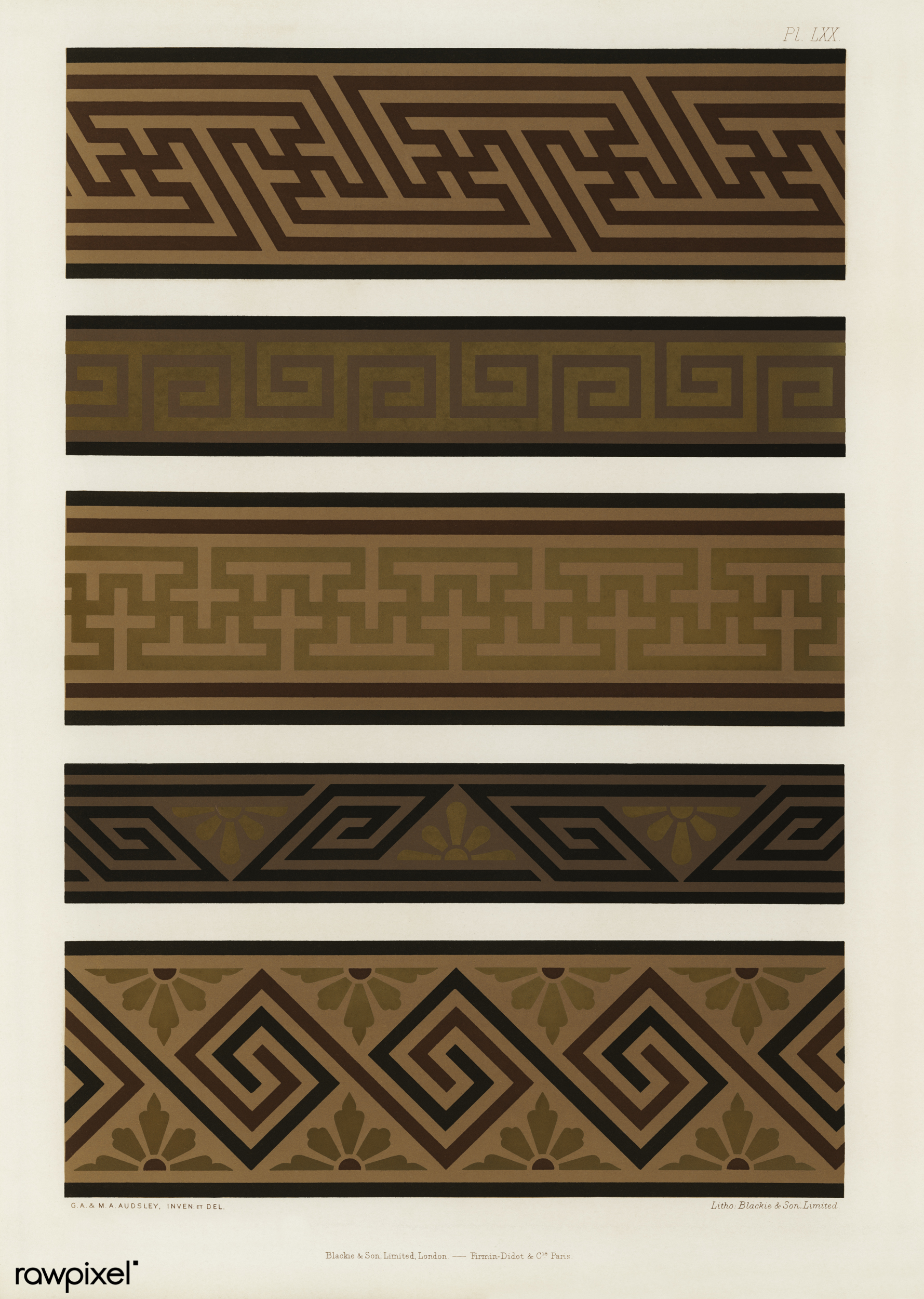
Vintage Japanese border designs using key patterns from The Practical Decorator and Ornamentist by G.A & M.A. Audsley

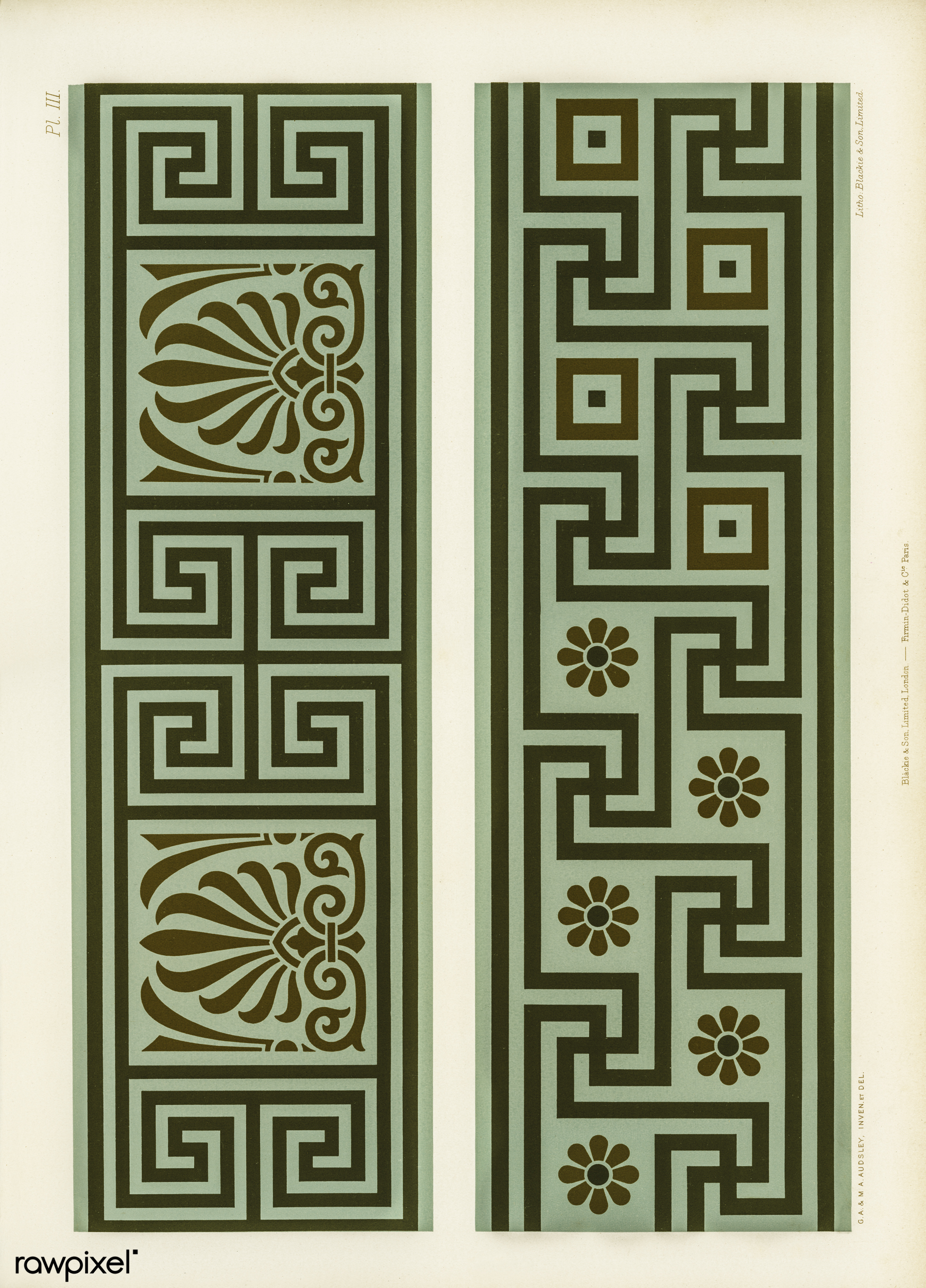
Antique Greek border designs of key patterns and other ornaments from The Practical Decorator and Ornamentist by G.A & M.A. Audsley

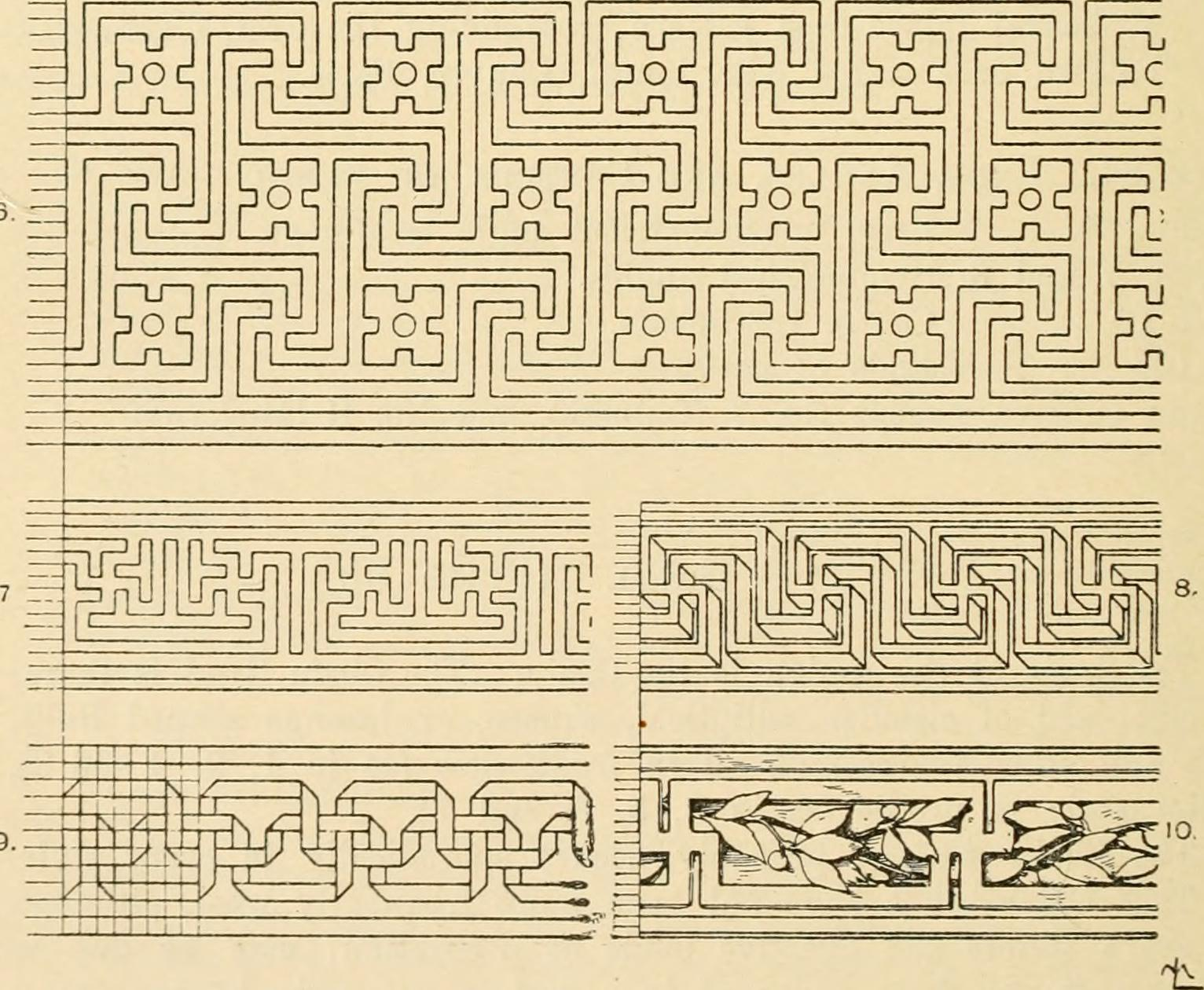
Variations in decorative key patterns from the Handbook of Ornament; A Grammar of Art, Industrial and Architectural Designing in All Its Branches, for Practical as well as Theoretical Use (1900)

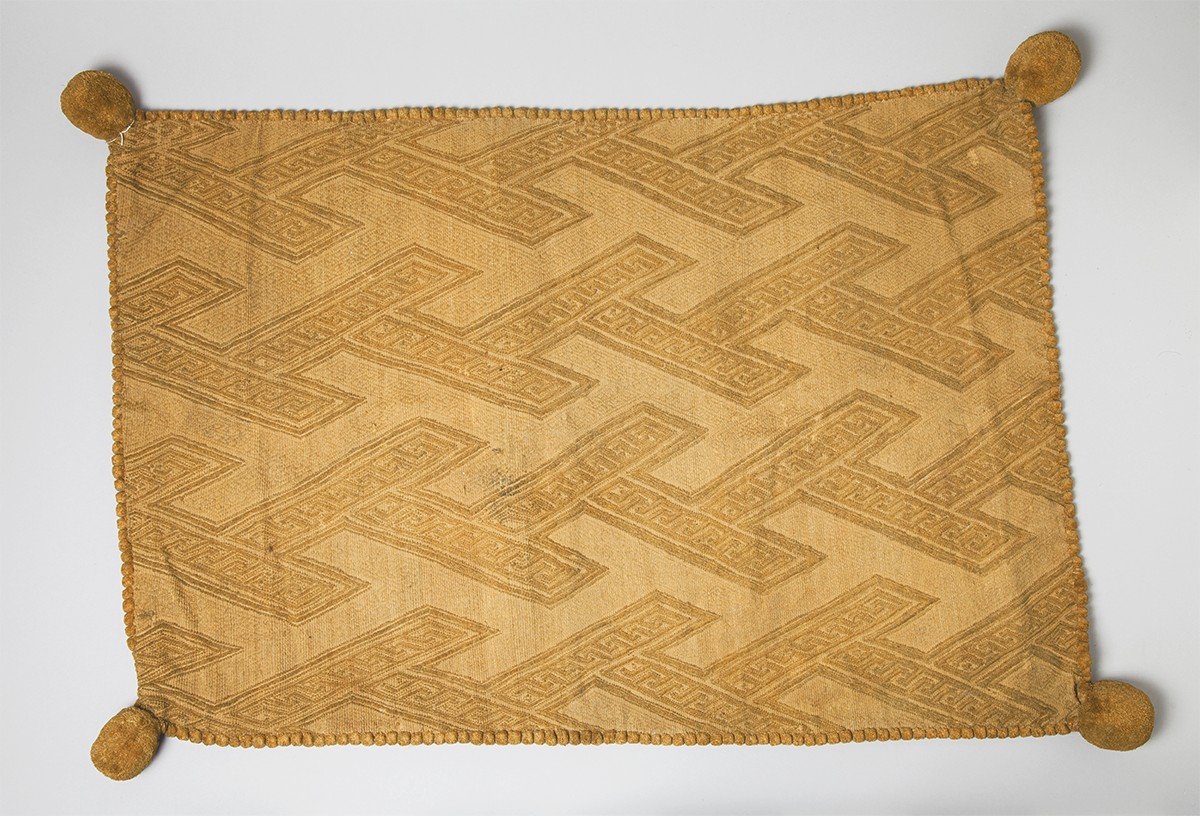
Cushion Cover, 17th century. Kongo textiles, Kongo peoples; The Kingdom of Kongo. Ethnographic Museum, Stockholm.
