= Carrick mat =

Flat woven decorative knot

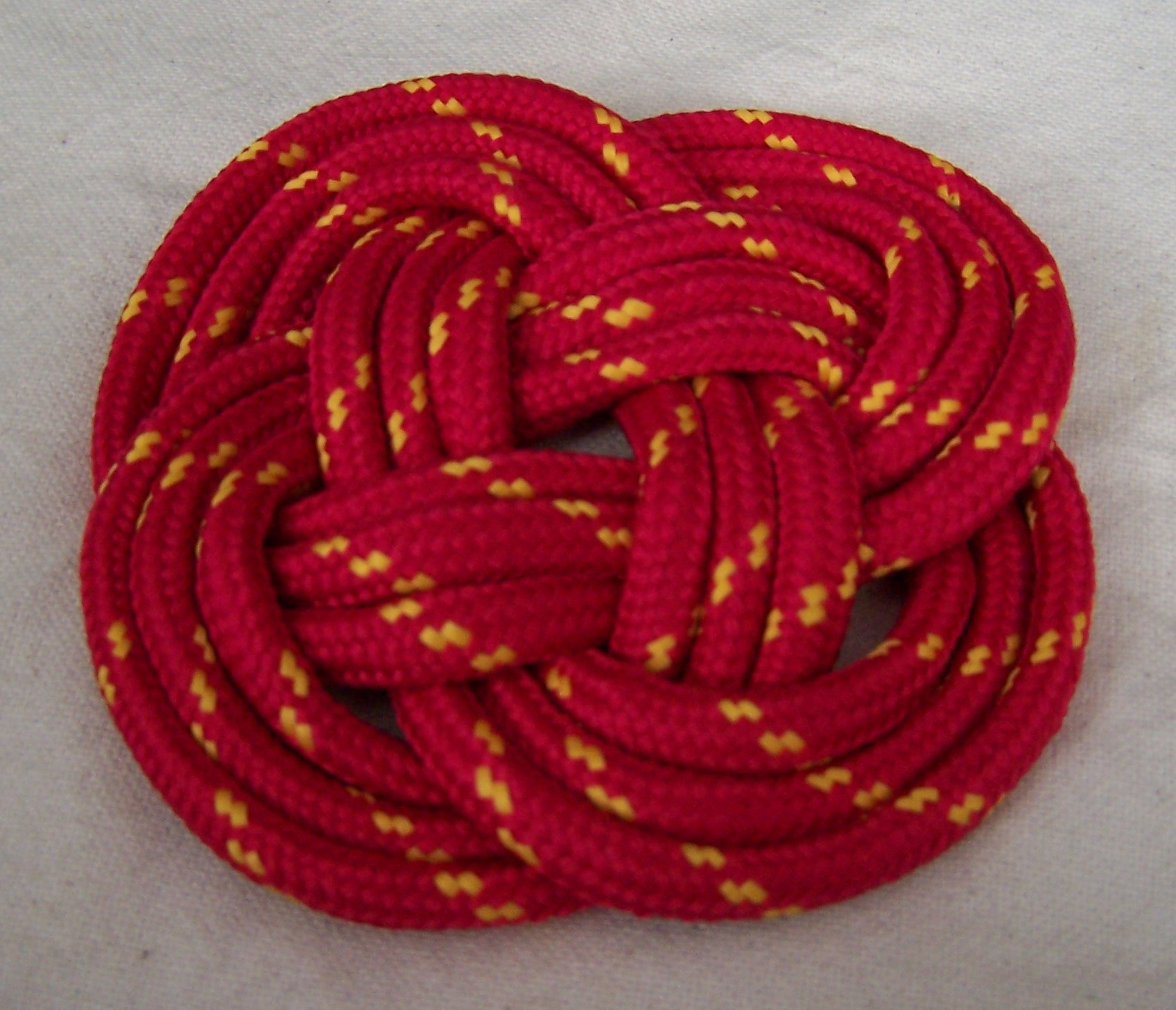
- Carrick mat made with three passes
- Names: Carrick mat, Prolong knot
- Category: Decorative
- Related: Carrick bend, Turk's head, Austrian knot
- Typical use: Mat for padding or decoration
- ABoK: #2242, #2244
- Instructions

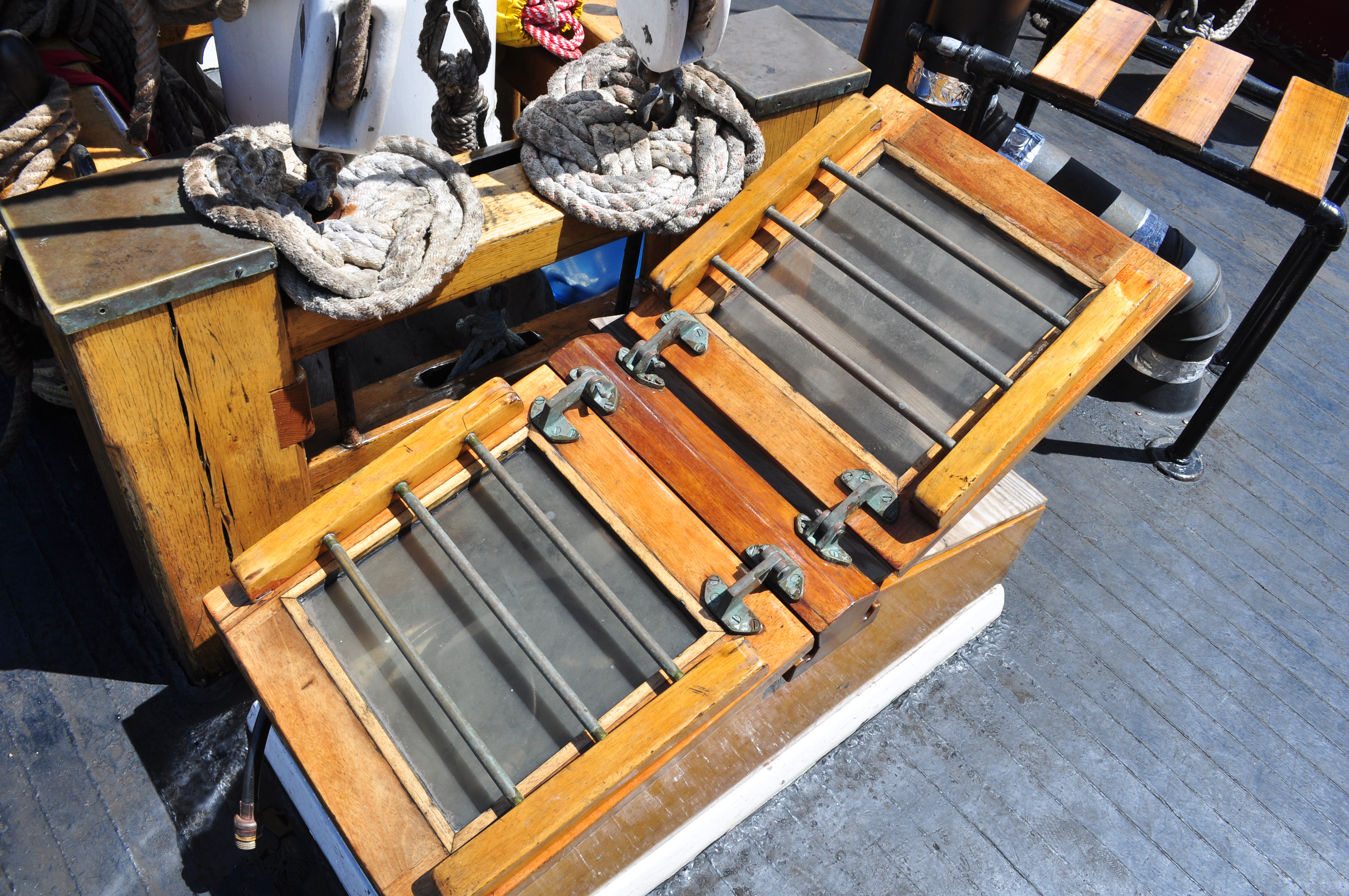
Carrick mats on schooner Adventuress, used to protect woodwork from the blocks when the lines are slack.

8_{18} knot
- Basic seamless form
- Arf invariant: 1
- Braid length: 8
- Braid no.: 3
- Bridge no.: 3
- Crosscap no.: 4
- Crossing no.: 8
- Genus: 3
- Hyperbolic volume: 12.35090621
- Unknotting no.: 2
- Conway notation: [8*]
- A–B notation: 8_{18}
- Dowker notation: 6, 8, 10, 12, 14, 16, 2, 4
- D–T notation: 8a12
- Last / Next: 8_{17} / 8_{19}

Other
- alternating, prime, fibered, prime, fully amphichiral

The carrick mat is a flat woven decorative knot which can be used as a mat or pad. Its name is based on the mat's decorative-type carrick bend with the ends connected together, forming an endless knot. A larger form, called the prolong knot, is made by expanding the basic carrick mat by extending, twisting, and overlapping its outer bights, then weaving the free ends through them. This process may be repeated to produce an arbitrarily long mat.

In its basic form it is the same as a 3-lead, 4-bight Turk's head knot. The basic carrick mat, made with two passes of rope, also forms the central motif in the logo of the International Guild of Knot Tyers.

When tied to form a cylinder around the central opening, instead of lying flat, it can be used as a woggle.

== See also ==
- List of knots
