= Turk's head knot =

Class of ornamental knots

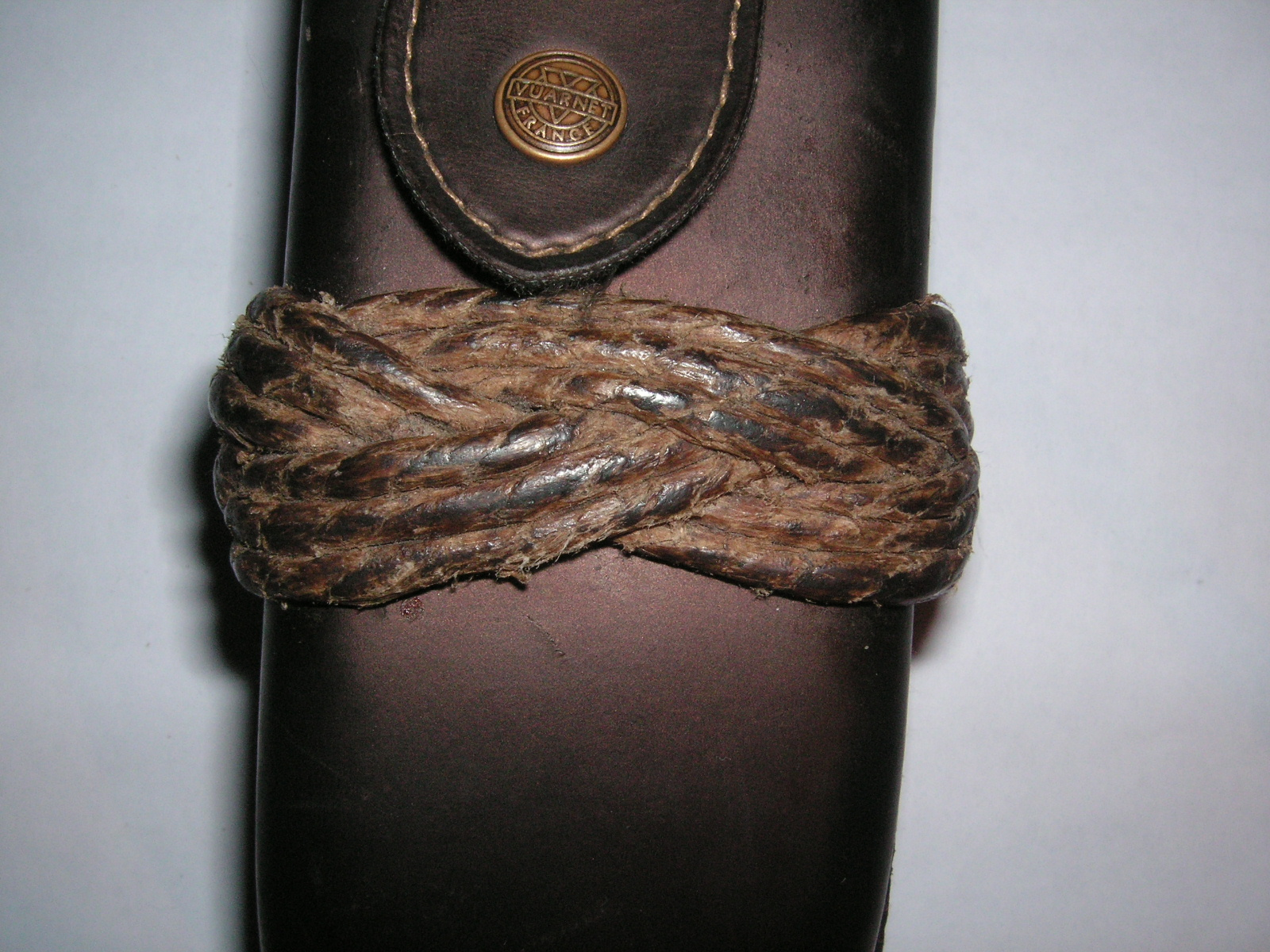
- Category: Decorative
- Origin: Ancient
- Related: Carrick mat
- Typical use: Decorative
- ABoK: 1278–1401 (Chapter 17: The Turk's-Head)
- Instructions

A Turk's head knot is a decorative knot with a variable number of interwoven strands forming a closed loop. The name refers to a general family of knots, not an individual knot. While this knot is typically made around a cylinder, it can also be formed into a flat, mat-like shape. Some variants can be arranged into a roughly spherical shape, akin to a monkey's fist knot.

This knot is primarily used for tightening up underlying material to overlay as a tubular covering knot, prevent slipping, and add a decorative element. A notable practical use for the Turk's head is to mark the "king spoke" of a ship's wheel (the spoke that is upright when the rudder is in a central position). The knot takes its name from its resemblance to a turban (Turkish: sarık), though a turban is wound rather than interwoven.

== Leads and bights ==
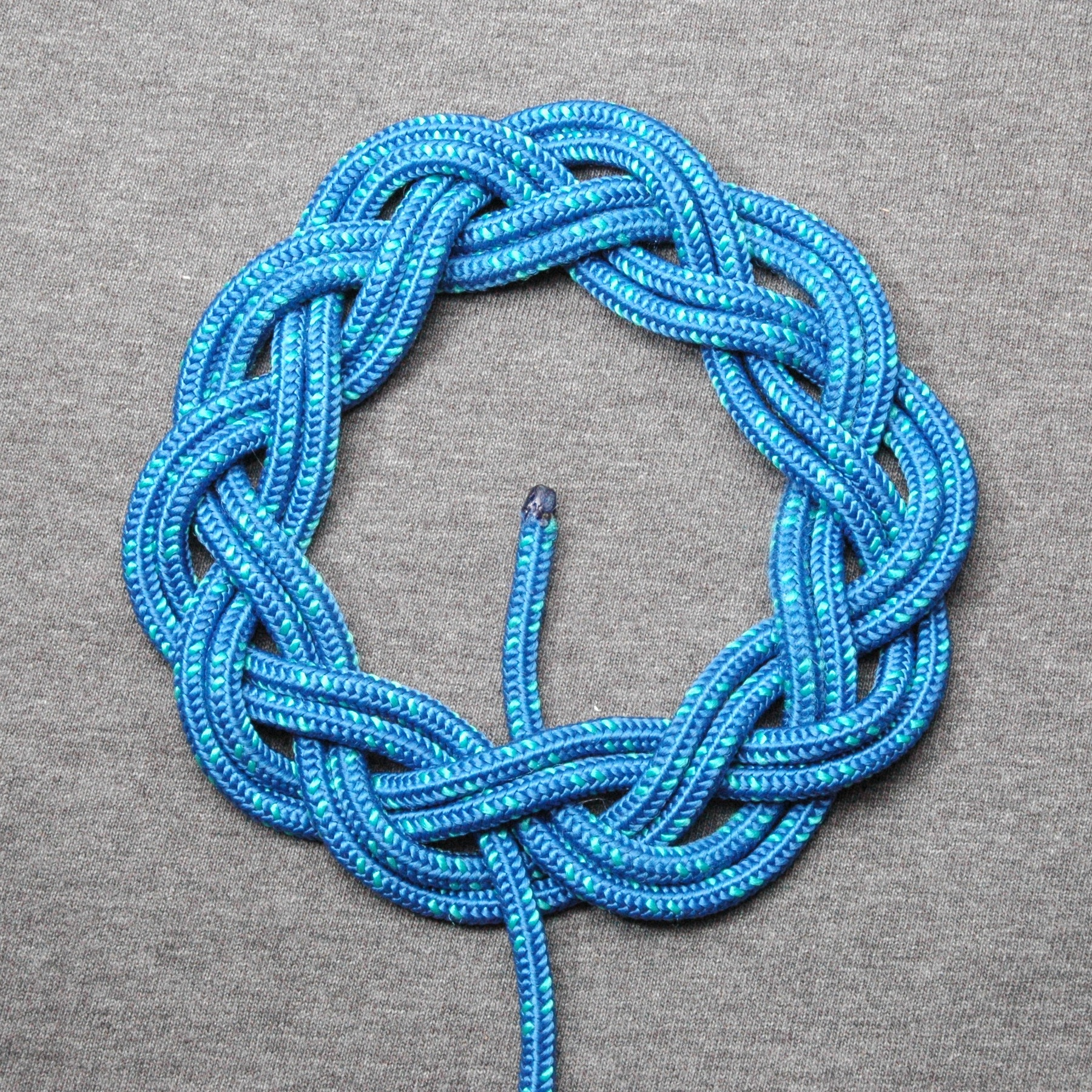
A 3-lead, 10-bight Turk's head knot, doubled

Different types of Turk's head knots are classified according to the number of leads and bights, as well as the method of construction. The number of bights is the number of crossings around the circumference of the cylinder. The number of leads refers to the number of strands around the circumference of the cylinder, before doubling, tripling, etc. Depending on the number of leads and bights, a Turk's head may be tied using a single strand or multiple strands. Mathematically, the number of strands is the greatest common divisor of the number of leads and the number of bights. The knot may be tied with a single strand if and only if the two numbers are co-prime. For example, 3 lead × 5 bights (3×5), or 5 lead × 7 bights (5×7).

There are three general groupings of Turk's head knots:

1. Narrow, where the number of leads is two or more less than the number of bights (3×5, or 3×7).
2. Long or wide, where the number of leads is two or more greater than the number of bights (5×3, or 16×7).
3. Square, where there is a difference of one between leads and bights (7×8 or 8×7).

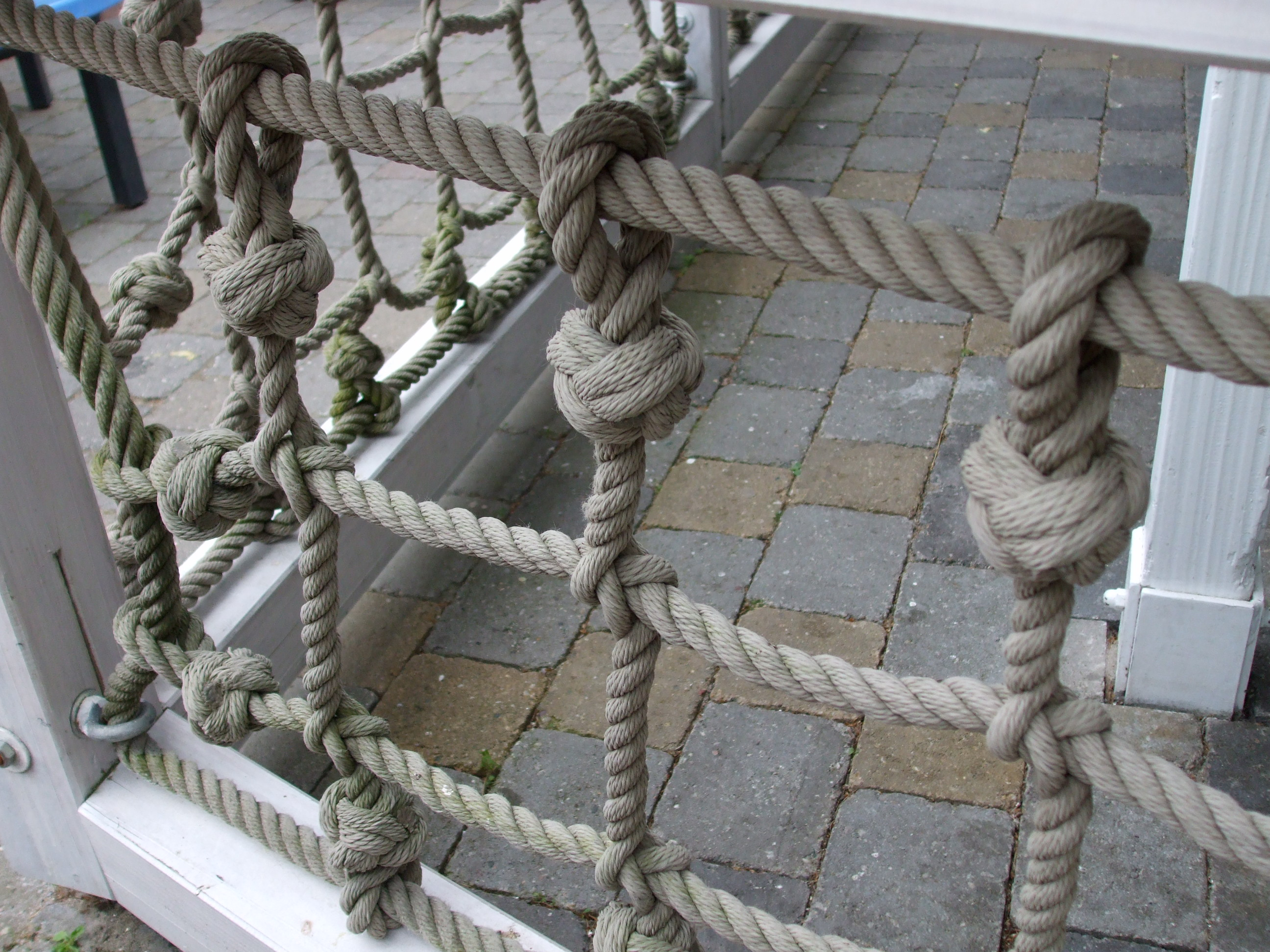
Turk's head knots on netting

The number of bights determines the shape found at the center. Three bights create a triangular shape, while four create a square. A two lead, 3 bight Turk's head is a double overhand knot.

A two lead, three bight Turk's head is also a trefoil knot if the ends are joined together. (2,n) alternating torus knots are (2,n) Turk's head knots. ((p,q) = q times around a circle in the interior of the torus, and p times around its axis of rotational symmetry.) Turk's head knots are easy to edit though hard to tie.

== Uses in culture ==
In the World Organization of the Scout Movement, the scarf rings called woggles to affix their neckerchiefs or scarfs are often variations of the Turk's head knot. The Gilwell Woggle is worn by Scout Leaders who complete training courses to be awarded the Wood Badge insignia. It is an official part of the uniform.

== See also ==
- List of knots
