= List of knot theory topics =

Knot theory is the study of mathematical knots. While inspired by knots which appear in daily life in shoelaces and rope, a mathematician's knot differs in that the ends are joined so that it cannot be undone. In precise mathematical language, a knot is an embedding of a circle in 3-dimensional Euclidean space, R^{3}. Two mathematical knots are equivalent if one can be transformed into the other via a deformation of R^{3} upon itself (known as an ambient isotopy); these transformations correspond to manipulations of a knotted string that do not involve cutting the string or passing the string through itself.

== Knots, links, braids ==
- Knot (mathematics) gives a general introduction to the concept of a knot.
  - Two classes of knots: torus knots and pretzel knots
  - Cinquefoil knot also known as a (5, 2) torus knot.
  - Figure-eight knot (mathematics) the only 4-crossing knot
  - Granny knot (mathematics) and Square knot (mathematics) are a connected sum of two Trefoil knots
  - Perko pair, two entries in a knot table that were later shown to be identical.
  - Stevedore knot (mathematics), a prime knot with crossing number 6
  - Three-twist knot is the twist knot with three-half twists, also known as the 5_{2} knot.
  - Trefoil knot A knot with crossing number 3
  - Unknot
- Knot complement, a compact 3 manifold obtained by removing an open neighborhood of a proper embedding of a tame knot from the 3-sphere.

Notation used in knot theory:

- Conway notation
- Dowker–Thistlethwaite notation (DT notation)
- Gauss code (see also Gauss diagrams)
- continued fraction

=== General knot types ===
- 2-bridge knot
- Alternating knot; a knot that can be represented by an alternating diagram (i.e. the crossing alternate over and under as one traverses the knot).
- Berge knot a class of knots related to Lens space surgeries and defined in terms of their properties with respect to a genus 2 Heegaard surface.
- Cable knot, see Satellite knot
- Chiral knot is knot which is not equivalent to its mirror image.
- Double torus knot, a knot that can be embedded in a double torus (a genus 2 surface).
- Fibered knot
- Framed knot
- Invertible knot
- Prime knot
- Legendrian knot are knots embedded in $\mathbb R^3$ tangent to the standard contact structure.
- Lissajous knot
- Ribbon knot
- Satellite knot
- Slice knot
- Torus knot
- Transverse knot
- Twist knot
- Virtual knot
- Wild knot

=== Links ===
- Borromean rings, the simplest Brunnian link
- Brunnian link, a set of links which become trivial if one loop is removed
- Hopf link, the simplest non-trivial link
- Solomon's knot, a two-ring link with four crossings.
- Whitehead link, a twisted loop linked with an untwisted loop.
- Unlink

General types of links:

- Algebraic link
- Hyperbolic link
- Pretzel link
- Split link
- String link

=== Tangles ===
- Tangle (mathematics)
- Algebraic tangle
- Tangle diagram
- Tangle product
- Tangle rotation
- Tangle sum
- Inverse of a tangle
- Rational tangle
- Tangle denominator closure
- Tangle numerator closure
- Reciprocal tangle

=== Braids ===
- Braid theory
  - Braid group

== Operations ==
- Band sum
- Flype
- Fox n-coloring
  - Tricolorability
- Knot sum
- Reidemeister move

=== Elementary treatment using polygonal curves ===
- elementary move (R1 move, R2 move, R3 move)
- R-equivalent
- delta-equivalent

== Invariants and properties ==
- Knot invariant is an invariant defined on knots which is invariant under ambient isotopies of the knot.
- Finite type invariant is a knot invariant that can be extended to an invariant of certain singular knots
- Knot polynomial is a knot invariant in the form of a polynomial whose coefficients encode some of the properties of a given knot.
  - Alexander polynomial and the associated Alexander matrix; The first knot polynomial (1923). Sometimes called the Alexander–Conway polynomial
  - Bracket polynomial is a polynomial invariant of framed links. Related to the Jones polynomial. Also known as the Kauffman bracket.
  - Conway polynomial uses Skein relations.
  - Homfly polynomial or HOMFLYPT polynomial.
  - Jones polynomial assigns a Laurent polynomial in the variable t^{1/2} to the knot or link.
  - Kauffman polynomial is a 2-variable knot polynomial due to Louis Kauffman.
- Arf invariant of a knot
- Average crossing number
- Bridge number
- Crosscap number
- Crossing number
- Hyperbolic volume
- Kontsevich invariant
- Linking number
- Milnor invariants
- Racks and quandles and Biquandle
- Ropelength
- Seifert surface
- Self-linking number
- Signature of a knot
- Skein relation
- Slice genus
- Tunnel number, the number of arcs that must be added to make the knot complement a handlebody
- Writhe

== Mathematical problems ==
- Berge conjecture
- Birman–Wenzl algebra
- Clasper (mathematics)
- Eilenberg–Mazur swindle
- Fáry–Milnor theorem
- Gordon–Luecke theorem
- Khovanov homology
- Knot group
- Knot tabulation
- Knotless embedding
- Linkless embedding
- Link concordance
- Link group
- Link (knot theory)
- Milnor conjecture (topology)
- Milnor map
- Möbius energy
- Mutation (knot theory)
- Physical knot theory
- Planar algebra
- Smith conjecture
- Tait conjectures
- Temperley–Lieb algebra
- Thurston–Bennequin number
- Tricolorability
- Unknotting number
- Unknotting problem
- Volume conjecture

=== Theorems ===
- Schubert's theorem
- Conway's theorem
- Alexander's theorem

== Lists ==
- List of mathematical knots and links
  - List of prime knots
