= Virtual knot =

Generalization of knots in 3-dimensional Euclidean space

Unsolved problem in mathematics
[Extension of Jones polynomial to general 3-manifolds.] Can the original Jones polynomial, which is defined for 1-links in the 3-sphere (the 3-ball, the 3-space R3), be extended for 1-links in any 3-manifold?
More unsolved problems in mathematics

In knot theory, a virtual knot is a generalization of knots in 3-dimensional Euclidean space, R^{3}, to knots in thickened surfaces $\Sigma \times [0,1]$ modulo an equivalence relation called stabilization/destabilization. Here $\Sigma$ is required to be closed and oriented. Virtual knots were first introduced by Kauffman (1999).

== Overview ==
In the theory of classical knots, knots can be considered equivalence classes of knot diagrams under the Reidemeister moves. Likewise a virtual knot can be considered an equivalence of virtual knot diagrams that are equivalent under generalized Reidemeister moves. Virtual knots allow for the existence of, for example, knots whose Gauss codes which could not exist in 3-dimensional Euclidean space. A virtual knot diagram is a 4-valent planar graph, but each vertex is now allowed to be a classical crossing or a new type called virtual. The generalized moves show how to manipulate such diagrams to obtain an equivalent diagram; one move called the semi-virtual move involves both classical and virtual crossings, but all the other moves involve only one variety of crossing.

A classical knot can also be considered an equivalence class of Gauss diagrams under certain moves coming from the Reidemeister moves. Not all Gauss diagrams are realizable as knot diagrams, but by considering all equivalence classes of Gauss diagrams we obtain virtual knots.

A classical knot can be considered an ambient isotopy class of embeddings of the circle into a thickened 2-sphere. This can be generalized by considering such classes of embeddings into thickened higher-genus surfaces. This is not quite what we want since adding a handle to a (thick) surface will create a higher-genus embedding of the original knot. The adding of a handle is called stabilization and the reverse process destabilization. Thus a virtual knot can be considered an ambient isotopy class of embeddings of the circle into thickened surfaces with the equivalence given by (de)stabilization.

Some basic theorems relating classical and virtual knots:

- If two classical knots are equivalent as virtual knots, they are equivalent as classical knots.
- There is an algorithm to determine if a virtual knot is classical.
- There is an algorithm to determine if two virtual knots are equivalent.

There is a relation among the following.

- Virtual equivalence of virtual 1-knot diagrams, which is a set of virtual 1-knots.
- Welded equivalence of virtual 1-knot diagrams
- Rotational welded equivalence of virtual 1-knot diagrams
- Fiberwise equivalence of virtual 1-knot diagrams
