= Open knot theory =

Mathematical theory

The theory of open knots attempts to describe entanglements in open curves or filaments in a mathematically consistent way and develop tools and algorithms which can categorize the topology of an open curve. In the mathematical field of knot theory, knots are only considered in closed loops. What is colloquially considered a knot, for example a piece of rope tied into an overhand knot, would not be considered a mathematical knot unless the two ends of the rope were connected. Research into open knot theory is motivated by a desire to understand the formation and properties of knots in proteins and DNA molecules, which often do not form closed loops, and to draw closer connections between knot theory and the properties of physical knots.

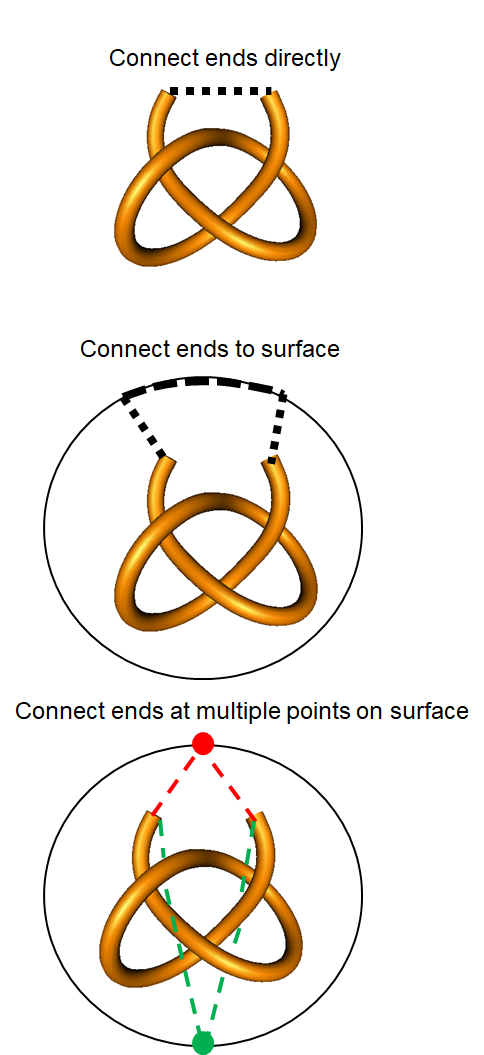
An open entangled curve virtually closed. If the ends are connected directly or to two close points on an enclosing sphere, the curve can be classified as a trefoil knot. If the ends are connected to other points on the sphere, the curve may be an unknot (green) or a trefoil (red).

== Virtual closure ==
Drawing a straight line from one end of a curve to another effectively closes it into a loop. After this virtual closure, the knot can be classified by computing an invariant such as the Alexander polynomial. If the two ends of a knotted curve filament are close to each other or well separated from the highly knotted portion, this direct virtual closure will not introduce new crossings into a diagram. However, there are configurations where direct closure can virtually turn a knot into a slipknot and effectively erase the knot, or introduce additional complexity that is not present in the initial curve. In such cases, it may be beneficial to connect the ends of the curve by virtual lines to an external surface enclosing the curve, such as a sphere with a large radius, and then connecting the ends of two lines along the surface so that they do not interfere with the curve itself. An algorithm known as minimally interfering closure will determine whether the two ends of an open polygonal knot are closer to each other or to the convex hull of the knot, and connect them by whichever path is shorter.

The choice of virtual closure scheme will influence which type of knot a curve is determined to be consistent with. A more general method known as stochastic closure chooses many uniformly distributed points on the surface of a large sphere enclosing the curve and connects the ends to each of those points and computes the knot type at each closure. This yields a distribution of different knot types at different regions around the sphere which can be visualized as a map. This is primarily used for analyzing knotted proteins.

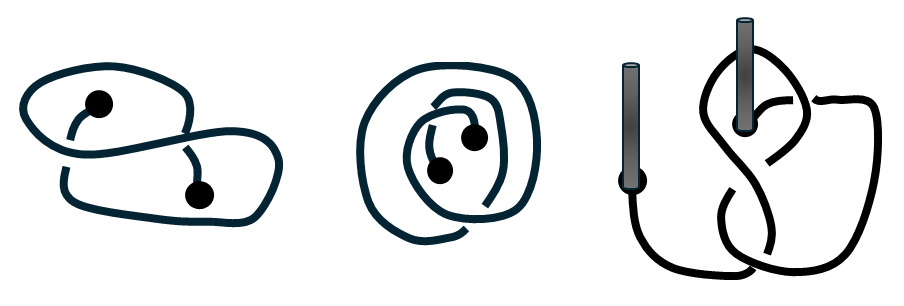
Three knotoid diagrams, two with two crossings and one with three crossings. The ends of the three-crossing knotoid are shown with pegs, to demonstrate that the curve cannot be passed over them.

== Knotoids and virtual knots ==
Rather than attempting to map an open curve onto a specific closed knot, concepts have been developed to classify open entanglements. One such concept is the knotoid which is a generalization of a knot diagram which includes the two ends of the curve, first described by Turaev in 2010. When a Reidemeister move is applied to a diagram of a knot, the knot topology cannot change. If a Reidemeister move on a knotoid diagram moves part of the curve over one of the ends, it will change the type of knotoid and is considered "forbidden." In this sense, a knotoid can be envisioned as a knotted piece of string on ground with its ends attached to two vertical pegs; the knotoid type will not change unless the string is lifted and unwrapped around the pegs. Like knots, knotoids can be classified based on their crossing number, and invariants such as polynomials have been derived to distinguish them. An open curve in three dimensions will be consistent with different knotoids depending on the surface that it is projected onto. Similar to stochastic closure, the full picture of a curve's topological complexity must be determined by sampling the knotoids of many projections. It is possible to compute the minimum number of "forbidden" knotoid moves (passing a curve in the diagram over one of the ends) to reach a trivial crossing-free knotoid, which provides a measure of complexity of an open curve similar to the unknotting number.

Virtual knots are another generalization of knot diagrams. Whereas knotoids deal with ambiguous closure, virtual knots deal with ambiguous crossings. Where one part of a knot diagram passes over or under another, two parts of a virtual knot diagram may meet at a point, called a virtual crossing. A diagram of an open knot may be treated as a virtual knot by connecting its to ends with a line and creating a virtual crossing at each point the end intersects the diagram.

== Extension of knot invariants ==
Definitions of knot invariants that categorize the topology of closed curves can be generalized to describe open curves. An example is the space writhe which is an extension of the Gauss linking number, and describes how many times a curve will cross over itself when viewed from different directions. More entangled and twisted curves will typically have a higher space writhe, however an unentangled curve such as a helix will also have a high space writhe. Similarly, the Gauss linking integral can be computed from two open curves, such as two strands in a hair braid, to determine how many times one curve winds around another. Other knot invariants have also been extended to open curves, including the second Vassiliev invariant and the Jones polynomial.

== Applications ==
Many of the techniques used to categorize open entangled curves have been applied to the study of knotted proteins. This includes a categorization of knotted protein structures based on stochastic closure, using knotoids, virtual knots, the space writhe, and open versions of the second Vassiliev invariant and Jones polynomial. Beyond simply categorization, a goal of this research is to understand the formation and stability of these knotted proteins. Similar analysis has also been applied to DNA, which does not have a stable native state like proteins do. The most common tool used to determine the topology of simulated DNA molecules is the Alexander molecule combined with chain closure, which has been used to detect knots in simulated DNA in virus capsids, human chromosomes, as well as simpler models of polymers, of which DNA is an example. Beyond the study of biomolecules, tools from open knot theory have been applied to physical ropes, for example in determining the most effective way to tie two pieces of rope together by comparing the writhe within each type of knot to the force required to pull two tied ropes apart.
