= Self-linking number =

Invariant of framed knots

In knot theory, the self-linking number is an invariant of framed knots. It is related to the linking number of curves.

A framing of a knot is a choice of a non-zero non-tangent vector at each point of the knot. More precisely, a framing is a choice of a non-zero section in the normal bundle of the knot, i.e. a (non-zero) normal vector field. Given a framed knot C, the self-linking number is defined to be the linking number of C with a new curve obtained by pushing points of C along the framing vectors.

Given a Seifert surface for a knot, the associated Seifert framing is obtained by taking a tangent vector to the surface pointing inwards and perpendicular to the knot. The self-linking number obtained from a Seifert framing is always zero.

The blackboard framing of a knot is the framing where each of the vectors points in the vertical (z) direction. The self-linking number obtained from the blackboard framing is called the Kauffman self-linking number of the knot. This is not a knot invariant because it is only well-defined up to regular isotopy.
