= Petal projection =

Form of knot diagram

Petal projection of a trefoil knot, the unique nontrivial knot with petal number five

In knot theory, a petal projection of a knot is a knot diagram with a single crossing, at which an odd number of non-nested arcs ("petals") all meet. Because the above-below relation between the branches of a knot at this crossing point is not apparent from the appearance of the diagram, it must be specified separately, as a permutation describing the top-to-bottom ordering of the branches.

Every knot or link has a petal projection; the minimum number of petals in such a projection defines a knot invariant, the petal number of the knot. For example, the petal number of a torus knot of type (r, r+2), for odd r ≥ 3, has been shown to equal 2r + 3. Petal projections can be used to define the Petaluma model, a family of probability distributions on knots with a given number of petals, defined by choosing a random permutation for the branches of a petal diagram.

== Petal projection ==
A petal projection is a description of a knot as a special kind of knot diagram, a two-dimensional self-crossing curve formed by projecting the knot from three dimensions down to a plane. In a petal projection, this diagram has only one crossing point, forming a topological rose. Every two branches of the curve that pass through this point cross each other there; branches that meet tangentially without crossing are not allowed. The "petals" formed by arcs of the curve that leave and then return to this crossing point are all non-nested, bounding closed disks that are disjoint except for their common intersection at the crossing point.

Beyond this topological description, the precise shape of the curve is unimportant. For instance, curves of this type could be realized algebraically as certain rose curves. However, it is common instead to draw a petal projection using straight line segments across the crossing point, connected at their endpoints by smooth curves to form the petals.

In order to specify the above-below relation of the branches of the curve at the crossing point, each branch is labeled with an integer, from 1 to the number of branches, giving its position in the top-down ordering of the branches as would be seen from a three-dimensional viewpoint above the projected diagram. The cyclic permutation of these integers, in the radial ordering of the branches around the crossing point, can be used as a purely combinatorial description of the petal projection.

In order to form a single knot, rather than a link, a petal projection must have an odd number of branches at its crossing point. Every knot can be represented as a petal projection, for diagrams with a sufficiently large number of petals. The minimum possible number of petals in a petal projection of a given knot defines a knot invariant called its petal number.

== Petaluma model ==
The Petaluma model is a random distribution on knots, parameterized by an odd number $2n+1$ of petals in a petal diagram, and defined by constructing a petal diagram with this number of petals using a uniformly random permutation on its branches.

== Generalization to links ==
Petal projections, and the petaluma model, can be generalized from knots to links. However, for this generalization, it is no longer possible to guarantee that all petals are non-nested. Instead, the generalized petal projections for links have a different type of standard diagram allowing some nesting of the petals.
