= 2-bridge knot =

Type of knot in knot theory

Schematic picture of a 2-bridge knot.

Bridge number 2

3_{1}

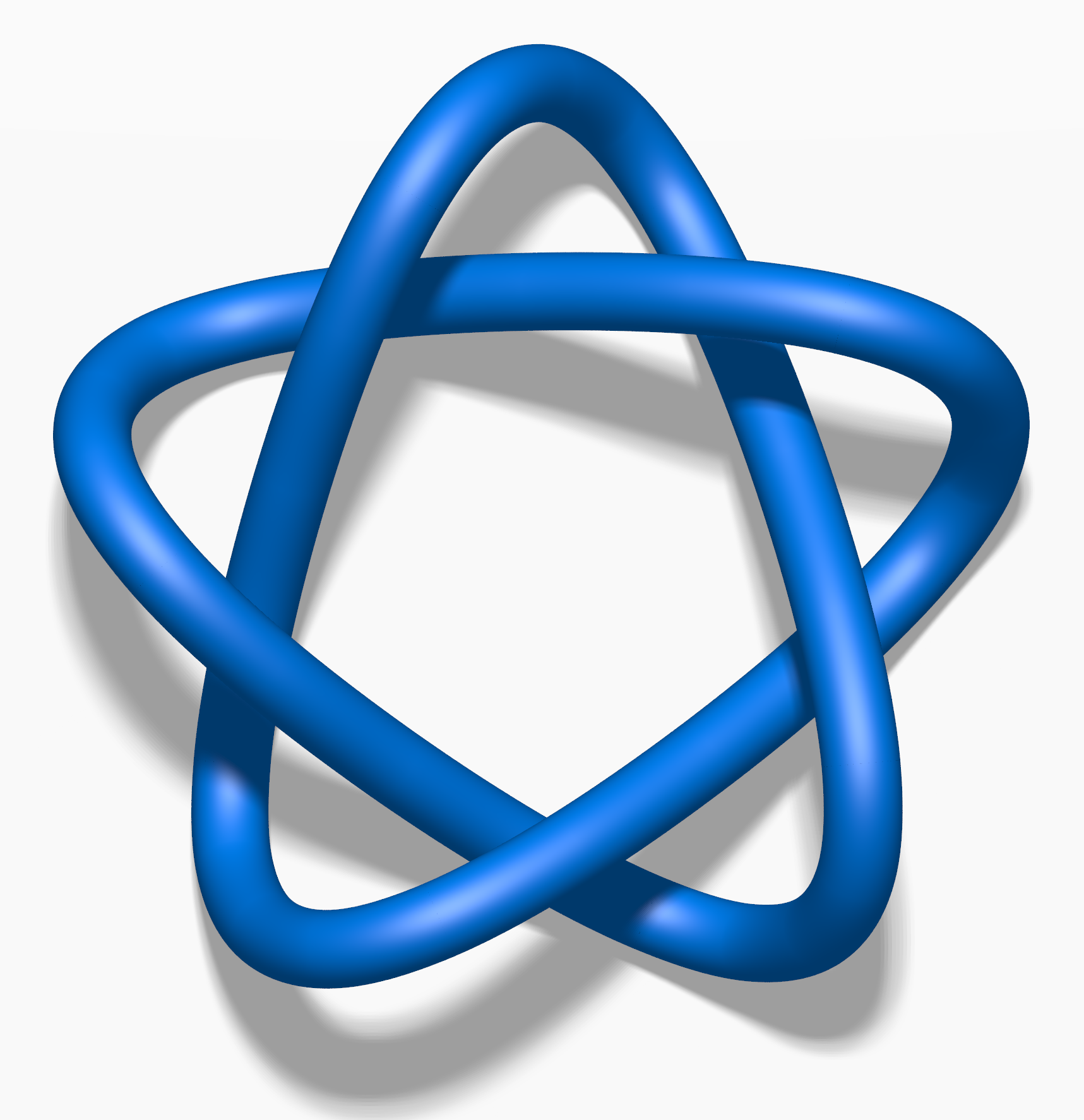
5_{1}

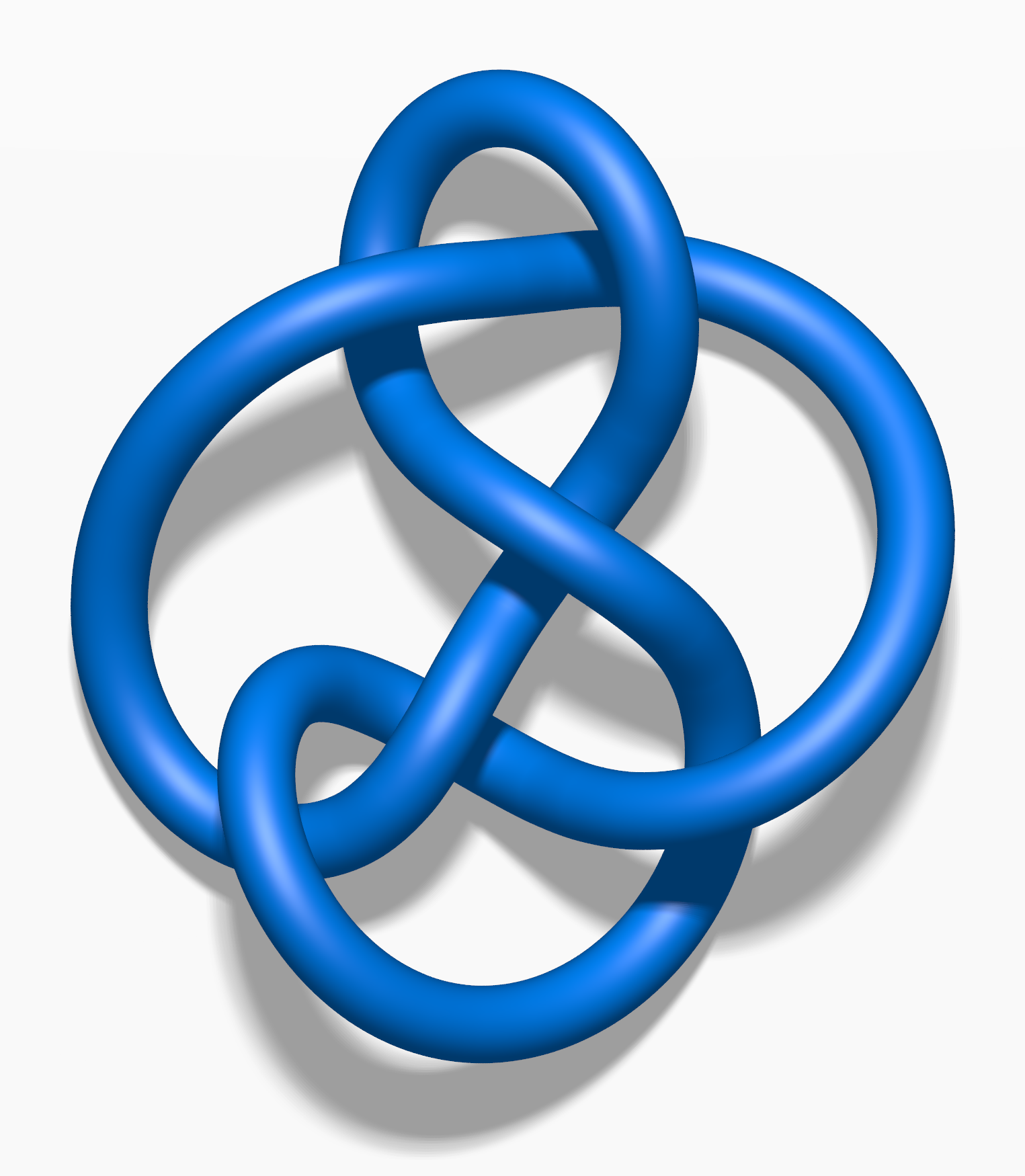
6_{3}

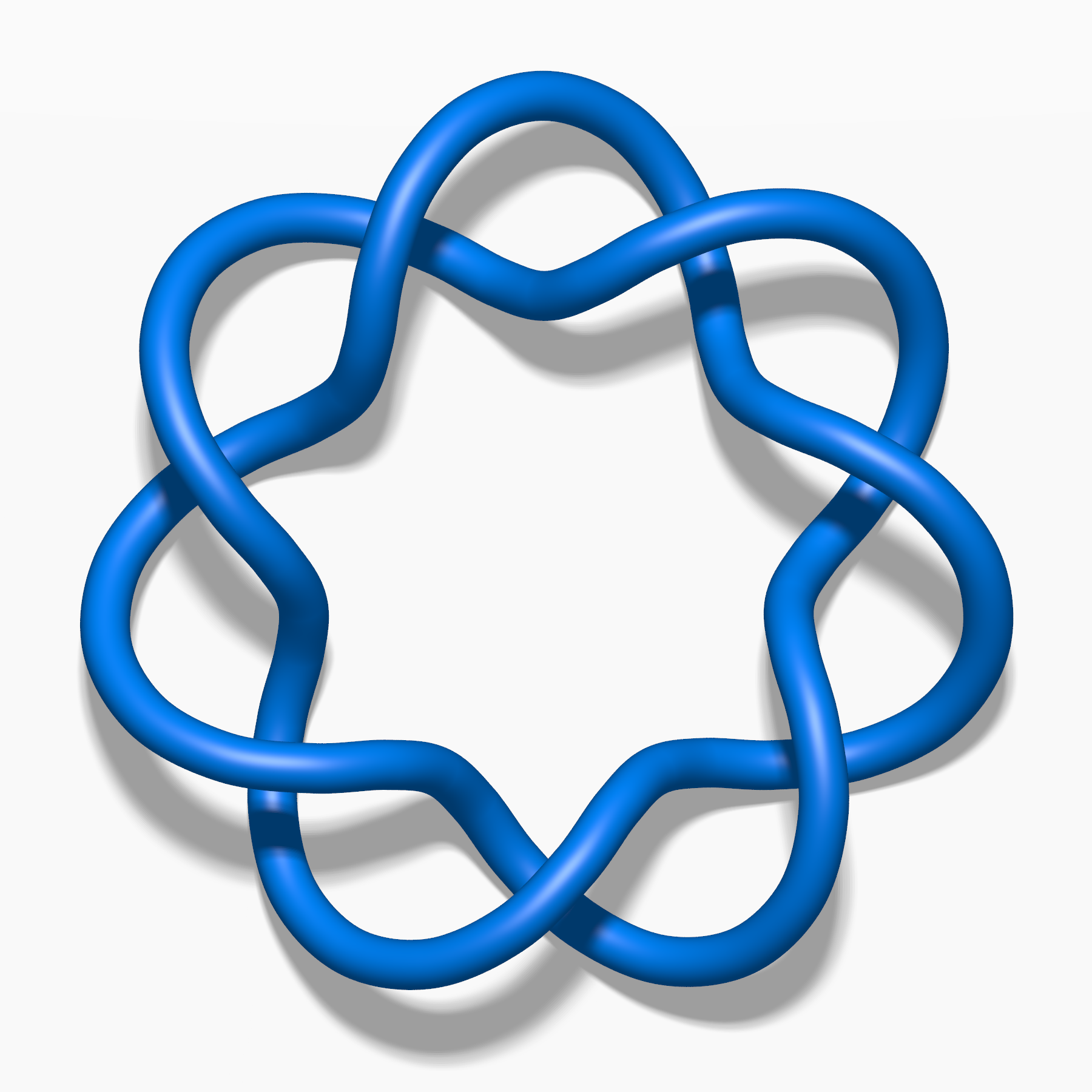
7_{1}...

In the mathematical field of knot theory, a 2-bridge knot is a knot which can be regular isotoped so that the natural height function given by the z-coordinate has only two maxima and two minima as critical points. Equivalently, these are the knots with bridge number 2, the smallest possible bridge number for a nontrivial knot. Every nontrivial knot with up to seven crossings is a 2-bridge knot. The simplest knots with a bridge number of 3 have eight crossings. Of the 1,701,936 knots with up to sixteen crossings, 5,546 are 2-bridge knots.

Other names for 2-bridge knots are rational knots, 4-plats, and Viergeflechte (German for 'four braids'). 2-bridge links are defined similarly as above, but each component will have one min and max. 2-bridge knots were classified by Horst Schubert, using the fact that the 2-sheeted branched cover of the 3-sphere over the knot is a lens space.

== Schubert normal form ==
The names rational knot and rational link were coined by John Conway who defined them as arising from numerator closures of rational tangles. This definition can be used to give a bijection between the set of 2-bridge links and the set of rational numbers; the rational number associated to a given link is called the Schubert normal form of the link (as this invariant was first defined by Schubert), and is precisely the fraction associated to the rational tangle whose numerator closure gives the link.
