= Conway notation (knot theory) =

Notation used to describe knots based on operations on tangles

The full set of fundamental transformations and operations on 2-tangles, alongside the elementary tangles 0, ∞, ±1 and ±2.

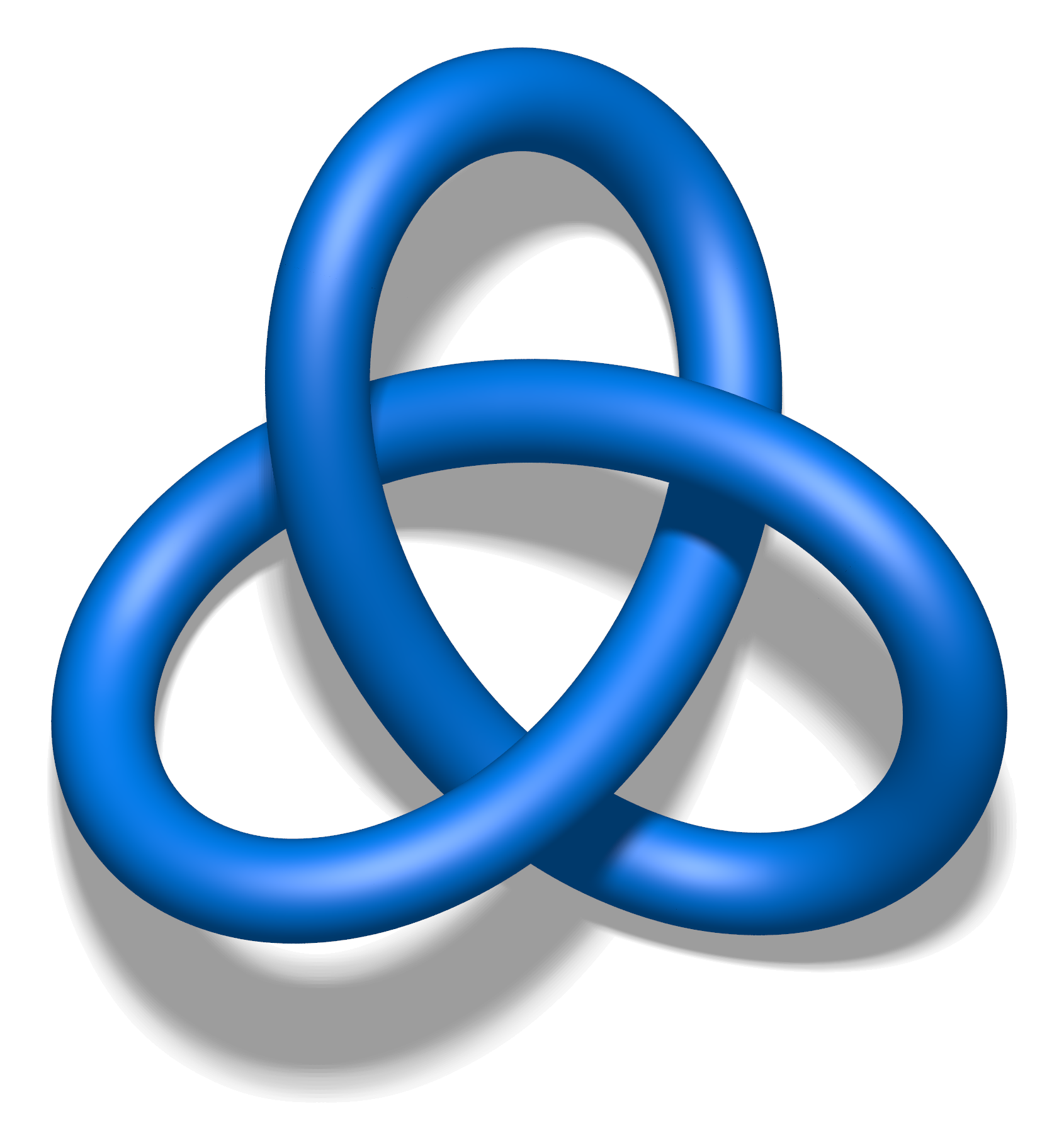
The trefoil knot has Conway notation [3].

In knot theory, Conway notation, invented by John Horton Conway, is a way of describing knots that makes many of their properties clear. It composes a knot using certain operations on tangles to construct it.

== Basic concepts ==
=== Tangles ===
In Conway notation, the tangles are generally algebraic 2-tangles. This means their tangle diagrams consist of 2 arcs and 4 points on the edge of the diagram; furthermore, they are built up from rational tangles using the Conway operations.

[The following seems to be attempting to describe only integer or 1/n rational tangles] Tangles consisting only of positive crossings are denoted by the number of crossings, or if there are only negative crossings it is denoted by a negative number. If the arcs are not crossed, or can be transformed into an uncrossed position with the Reidemeister moves, it is called the 0 or ∞ tangle, depending on the orientation of the tangle.

=== Operations on tangles ===
If a tangle, a, is reflected on the NW-SE line, it is denoted by ^{−}a. (Note that this is different from a tangle with a negative number of crossings.) Tangles have three binary operations, sum, product, and ramification, however all can be explained using tangle addition and negation. The tangle product, a b, is equivalent to ^{−}a+b. and ramification or a,b, is equivalent to ^{−}a+^{−}b.

== Advanced concepts ==
Rational tangles are equivalent if and only if their fractions are equal. An accessible proof of this fact is given in (Kauffman and Lambropoulou 2004). A number before an asterisk, *, denotes the polyhedron number; multiple asterisks indicate that multiple polyhedra of that number exist.

== See also ==
- Conway knot
- Dowker notation
- Alexander–Briggs notation
- Gauss notation
