= Crossing number =

Crossing number may refer to:

- Crossing number (knot theory) of a knot is the minimal number of crossings in any knot diagram for the knot.
  - The average crossing number is a variant of crossing number obtained from a three-dimensional embedding of a knot by averaging over all two-dimensional projections.
  - The link crossing number is the sum of positive and negative crossings
- Crossing number (graph theory) of a graph is the minimal number of edge intersections in any planar representation of the graph.
