= Berge knot =

Class of mathematical knot with special properties

In the mathematical theory of knots, a Berge knot (named after mathematician John Berge) or doubly primitive knot is any member of a particular family of knots in the 3-sphere. A Berge knot K is defined by the conditions:

1. K lies on a genus two Heegaard surface S
2. in each handlebody bound by S, K meets some meridian disc exactly once.

John Berge constructed these knots as a way of creating knots with lens space surgeries and classified all the Berge knots. Cameron Gordon conjectured these were the only knots admitting lens space surgeries. This is now known as the Berge conjecture.

== Berge conjecture ==
The Berge conjecture states that the only knots in the 3-sphere which admit lens space surgeries are Berge knots. The conjecture (and family of Berge knots) is named after John Berge.

Progress on the conjecture has been slow. Recently Yi Ni proved that if a knot admits a lens space surgery, then it is fibered. Subsequently, Joshua Greene showed that the lens spaces which are realized by surgery on a knot in the 3-sphere are precisely the lens spaces arising from surgery along the Berge knots.
