= Tunnel number =

In mathematics, the tunnel number of a knot, as first defined by Bradd Clark, is a knot invariant, given by the minimal number of arcs (called tunnels) that must be added to the knot so that the complement becomes a handlebody. The tunnel number can equally be defined for links. The boundary of a regular neighbourhood of the union of the link and its tunnels forms a Heegaard splitting of the link exterior.

== Examples ==
- The unknot is the only knot with tunnel number 0.
- The trefoil knot has tunnel number 1. In general, any nontrivial torus knot has tunnel number 1.

Every link L has a tunnel number. This can be seen, for example, by adding a 'vertical' tunnel at every crossing in a diagram of L. It follows from this construction that the tunnel number of a knot is always less than or equal to its crossing number.
