= Average crossing number =

In the mathematical subject of knot theory, the average crossing number of a knot is the result of averaging over all directions the number of crossings in a knot diagram of the knot obtained by projection onto the plane orthogonal to the direction. The average crossing number is often seen in the context of physical knot theory.

== Definition ==
More precisely, if K is a smooth knot, then for almost every unit vector v giving the direction, orthogonal projection onto the plane perpendicular to v gives a knot diagram, and we can compute the crossing number, denoted n(v). The average crossing number is then defined as the integral over the unit sphere:

$$\frac{1}{4\pi}\int_{S^2} n(v) \, dA$$

where dA is the area form on the 2-sphere. The integral makes sense because the set of directions where projection doesn't give a knot diagram is a set of measure zero and n(v) is locally constant when defined.

== Alternative formulation ==
A less intuitive but computationally useful definition is an integral similar to the Gauss linking integral.

A derivation analogous to the derivation of the linking integral will be given. Let K be a knot, parameterized by

$$f: S^1 \rightarrow \mathbb R^3.$$

Then define the map from the torus to the 2-sphere

$$g: S^1 \times S^1 \rightarrow S^2$$

by

$$g(s, t) = \frac{f(s) - f(t)}{|f(s) - f(t)|}.$$

(Technically, one needs to avoid the diagonal: points where s = t.) We want to count the number of times a point (direction) is covered by g. This will count, for a generic direction, the number of crossings in a knot diagram given by projecting along that direction. Using the degree of the map, as in the linking integral, would count the number of crossings with sign, giving the writhe. Use g to pull back the area form on S^{2} to the torus T^{2} = S^{1} × S^{1}. Instead of integrating this form, integrate the absolute value of it, to avoid the sign issue. The resulting integral is

$$\frac{1}{4\pi}\int_{T^2} \frac{|(f'(s) \times f'(t)) \cdot (f(s) - f(t))|}{|(f(s) -f(t))|^3} \, ds\, dt.$$
