= Lamp cord trick =

Mathematical observation

In topology, a branch of mathematics, and specifically knot theory, the lamp cord trick is an observation that two certain spaces are homeomorphic, even if one of the components is knotted. The spaces are $M^3\backslash T_i,i=1,2$, where $M^3$ is a hollow ball homeomorphic to $S^2\times[0,1]$ and $T_i$ a tube connecting the boundary components of $M^3$. The name comes from R. H. Bing's book "The Geometric Topology of 3-manifolds".
