= Alexander matrix =

In mathematics, an Alexander matrix is a presentation matrix for the Alexander invariant of a knot. The determinant of an Alexander matrix is the Alexander polynomial for the knot.
