= Chiral knot =

Knot that is not equivalent to its mirror image

In the mathematical field of knot theory, a chiral knot is a knot that is not equivalent to its mirror image (when identical while reversed). An oriented knot that is equivalent to its mirror image is an amphichiral knot, also called an achiral knot. The chirality of a knot is a knot invariant. A knot's chirality can be further classified depending on whether or not it is invertible.

There are only five knot symmetry types, indicated by chirality and invertibility: fully chiral, invertible, positively amphichiral noninvertible, negatively amphichiral noninvertible, and fully amphichiral invertible.

== Background ==
The possible chirality of certain knots was suspected since 1847 when Johann Listing asserted that the trefoil was chiral, and this was proven by Max Dehn in 1914. P. G. Tait found all amphichiral knots up to 10 crossings and conjectured that all amphichiral knots had even crossing number. Mary Gertrude Haseman found all 12-crossing and many 14-crossing amphichiral knots in the late 1910s. But a counterexample to Tait's conjecture, a 15-crossing amphichiral knot, was found by Jim Hoste, Morwen Thistlethwaite, and Jeff Weeks in 1998. However, Tait's conjecture was proven true for prime, alternating knots.

Number of knots of each type of chirality for each crossing number
Number of crossings	3	4	5	6	7	8	9	10	11	12	13	14	15	16	OEIS sequence
Chiral knots	1	0	2	2	7	16	49	152	552	2118	9988	46698	253292	1387166	N/A
Invertible knots	1	0	2	2	7	16	47	125	365	1015	3069	8813	26712	78717	A051769
Fully chiral knots	0	0	0	0	0	0	2	27	187	1103	6919	37885	226580	1308449	A051766
Amphichiral knots	0	1	0	1	0	5	0	13	0	58	0	274	1	1539	A052401
Positive Amphichiral Noninvertible knots	0	0	0	0	0	0	0	0	0	1	0	6	0	65	A051767
Negative Amphichiral Noninvertible knots	0	0	0	0	0	1	0	6	0	40	0	227	1	1361	A051768
Fully Amphichiral knots	0	1	0	1	0	4	0	7	0	17	0	41	0	113	A052400

Both possible trefoil knots.

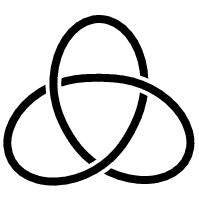
The left-handed trefoil knot.

The right-handed trefoil knot.

The simplest chiral knot is the trefoil knot, which was shown to be chiral by Max Dehn. All nontrivial torus knots are chiral. The Alexander polynomial cannot distinguish a knot from its mirror image, but the Jones polynomial can in some cases; if V_{k}(q) ≠ V_{k}(q^{−1}), then the knot is chiral, however the converse is not true. The HOMFLY polynomial is even better at detecting chirality, but there is no known polynomial knot invariant that can fully detect chirality.

=== Invertible knot ===
A chiral knot that can be smoothly deformed to itself with the opposite orientation is classified as a invertible knot. Examples include the trefoil knot.

=== Fully chiral knot ===
If a knot is not equivalent to its inverse or its mirror image, it is a fully chiral knot, for example the 9 32 knot.

== Amphichiral knot ==
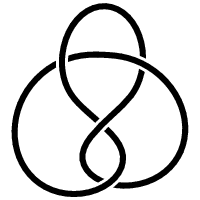
The figure-eight knot is the simplest amphichiral knot.

An amphichiral knot is one which has an orientation-reversing self-homeomorphism of the 3-sphere, α, fixing the knot set-wise. All amphichiral alternating knots have even crossing number. The first amphichiral knot with odd crossing number is a 15-crossing knot discovered by Hoste et al.

=== Fully amphichiral ===
If a knot is isotopic to both its reverse and its mirror image, it is fully amphichiral. The simplest knot with this property is the figure-eight knot.

=== Positive amphichiral ===
If the self-homeomorphism, α, preserves the orientation of the knot, it is said to be positive amphichiral. This is equivalent to the knot being isotopic to its mirror. No knots with crossing number smaller than twelve are positive amphichiral and noninvertible .

=== Negative amphichiral ===
The first negative amphichiral knot.

If the self-homeomorphism, α, reverses the orientation of the knot, it is said to be negative amphichiral. This is equivalent to the knot being isotopic to the reverse of its mirror image. The noninvertible knot with this property that has the fewest crossings is the knot 8_{17}.
