= Tangle (mathematics) =

Approach to knot theory by John Conway

The (−2,3,7) pretzel knot has two right-handed twists in its first tangle, three left-handed twists in its second, and seven left-handed twists in its third.

In mathematics, a tangle is generally one of two related concepts:

- In John Conway's definition, an n-tangle is a proper embedding of the disjoint union of n arcs into a 3-ball; the embedding must send the endpoints of the arcs to 2n marked points on the ball's boundary.
- In link theory, a tangle is an embedding of n arcs and m circles into $\mathbf{R}^2 \times [0,1]$ – the difference from the previous definition is that it includes circles as well as arcs, and partitions the boundary into two (isomorphic) pieces, which is algebraically more convenient – it allows one to add tangles by stacking them, for instance.

A third, quite different use of tangle—this one graph theoretical—was introduced by Neil Robertson and Paul Seymour, who use it to describe separation in graphs. This usage has been extended to matroids.

The balance of this article discusses Conway's sense of tangles; for the link theory sense, see that article.

Two n-tangles are considered equivalent if there is an ambient isotopy of one tangle to the other keeping the boundary of the 3-ball fixed. Tangle theory can be considered analogous to knot theory except, instead of closed loops, strings whose ends are nailed down are used. See also braid theory.

== Tangle diagrams ==
Without loss of generality, consider the marked points on the 3-ball boundary to lie on a great circle. The tangle can be arranged to be in general position with respect to the projection onto the flat disc bounded by the great circle. The projection then gives us a tangle diagram, where we make note of over and undercrossings as with knot diagrams.

Tangles often show up as tangle diagrams in knot or link diagrams and can be used as building blocks for link diagrams, e.g. pretzel links.

== Rational and algebraic tangles ==
Some operations on tangles: Left: A tangle a and its reflection ^{−}a. Top right: Tangle addition, denoted by a + b. Center right: Tangle product, denoted by a b, equivalent to ^{−}a + b. Bottom right: Ramification, denoted by a , b, equivalent to ^{−}a + ^{−}b

A rational tangle is a 2-tangle that is homeomorphic to the trivial 2-tangle by a map of pairs consisting of the 3-ball and two arcs. The four endpoints of the arcs on the boundary circle of a tangle diagram are usually referred as NE, NW, SW, SE, with the symbols referring to the compass directions.

An arbitrary tangle diagram of a rational tangle may look very complicated, but there is always a diagram of a particular simple form: start with a tangle diagram consisting of two horizontal (vertical) arcs; add a "twist", i.e. a single crossing by switching the NE and SE endpoints (SW and SE endpoints); continue by adding more twists using either the NE and SE endpoints or the SW and SE endpoints. One can suppose each twist does not change the diagram inside a disc containing previously created crossings.

We can describe such a diagram by considering the numbers given by consecutive twists around the same set of endpoints, e.g. (2, 1, -3) means start with two horizontal arcs, then 2 twists using NE/SE endpoints, then 1 twist using SW/SE endpoints, and then 3 twists using NE/SE endpoints but twisting in the opposite direction from before. The list begins with 0 if you start with two vertical arcs. The diagram with two horizontal arcs is then (0), but we assign (0, 0) to the diagram with vertical arcs. A convention is needed to describe a "positive" or "negative" twist. Often, "rational tangle" refers to a list of numbers representing a simple diagram as described.

The fraction of a rational tangle $(a_0, a_1, a_2, \dots )$ is then defined as the number given by the continued fraction $[a_n, a_{n-1}, a_{n-2}, \dots]$. The fraction given by (0,0) is defined as $\infty$. Conway proved that the fraction is well-defined and completely determines the rational tangle up to tangle equivalence. An accessible proof of this fact is given in:. Conway also defined a fraction of an arbitrary tangle by using the Alexander polynomial.

=== Operations on tangles ===
There is an "arithmetic" of tangles with addition, multiplication, and reciprocal operations. An algebraic tangle is obtained from the addition and multiplication of rational tangles.

The numerator closure of a rational tangle is defined as the link obtained by joining the "north" endpoints together and the "south" endpoints also together. The denominator closure is defined similarly by grouping the "east" and "west" endpoints. Rational links are defined to be such closures of rational tangles.

== Conway notation ==
One motivation for Conway's study of tangles was to provide a notation for knots more systematic than the traditional enumeration found in tables.

== Applications ==
Tangles have been shown to be useful in studying DNA topology. The action of a given enzyme can be analysed with the help of tangle theory.

== See also ==
- Tanglement puzzle
