= Gauss notation =

Notation for mathematical knots

Gauss notation (also known as a Gauss code or Gauss words) is a notation for mathematical knots. It is created by enumerating and classifying the crossings of an embedding of the knot in a plane. It is named after the German mathematician Carl Friedrich Gauss (1777–1855).

Gauss code represents a knot with a sequence of integers. However, rather than every crossing being represented by two different numbers, crossings are labelled with only one number. When the crossing is an overcrossing, a positive number is listed. At an undercrossing, a negative number.

For example, the trefoil knot in Gauss code can be given as: 1,−2,3,−1,2,−3.

Gauss code is limited in its ability to identify knots by a few problems. The starting point on the knot at which to begin tracing the crossings is arbitrary, and there is no way to determine which direction to trace in. Also, the Gauss code is unable to indicate the handedness of each crossing, which is necessary to identify a knot versus its mirror. For example, the Gauss code for the trefoil knot does not specify if it is the right-handed or left-handed trefoil.

This last issue is often solved by using the extended Gauss code. In this modification, the positive/negative sign on the second instance of every number is chosen to represent the handedness of that crossing, rather than the over/under sign of the crossing, which is made clear in the first instance of the number. A right-handed crossing is given a positive number, and a left handed crossing is given a negative number.

== See also ==
- Conway notation (knot theory)
- Dowker–Thistlethwaite notation
