= Trefoil knot =

Simplest non-trivial closed knot with three crossings

Trefoil
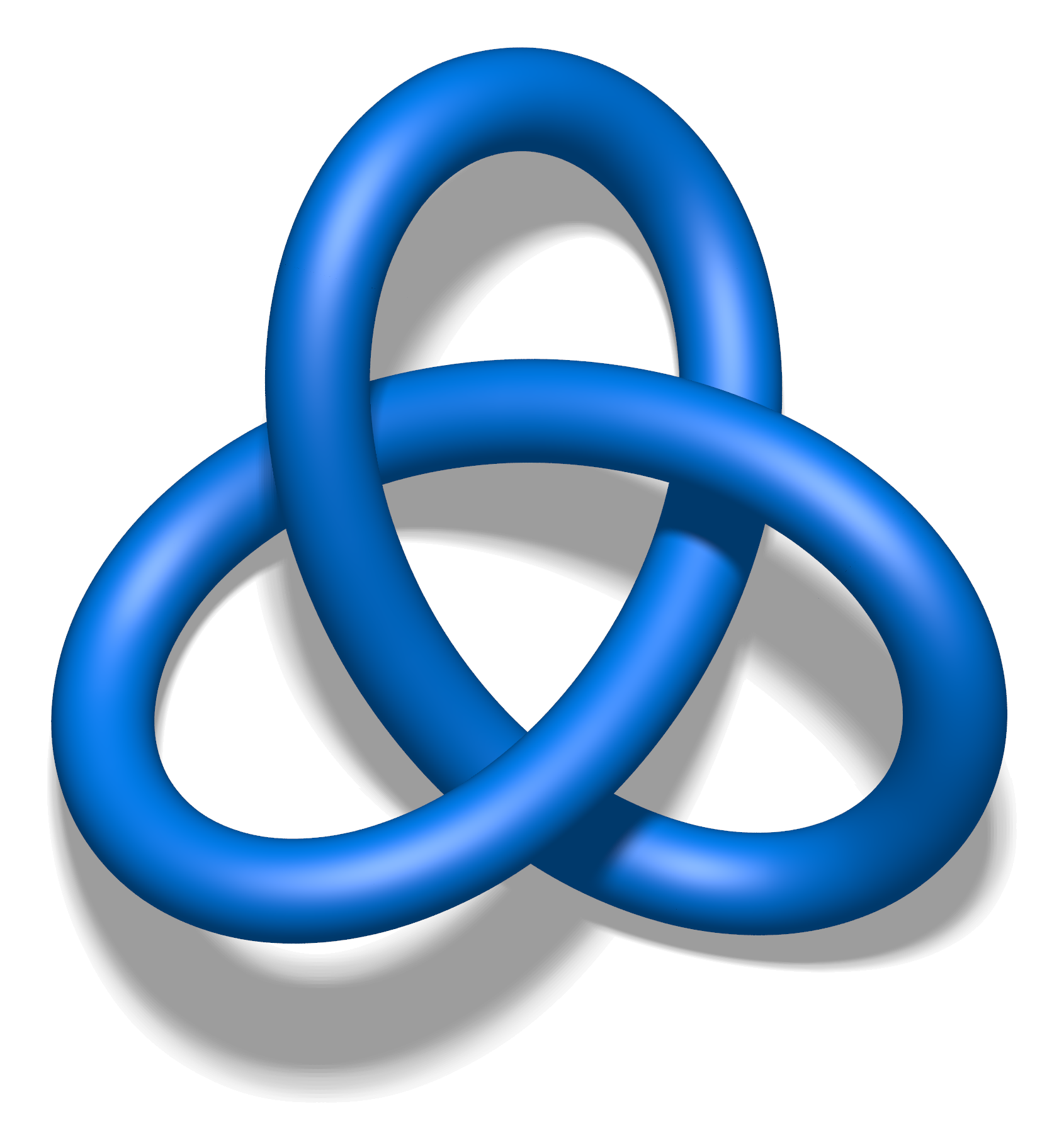
- Common name: Overhand knot
- Arf invariant: 1
- Braid length: 3
- Braid no.: 2
- Bridge no.: 2
- Crosscap no.: 1
- Crossing no.: 3
- Genus: 1
- Hyperbolic volume: 0
- Stick no.: 6
- Tunnel no.: 1
- Unknotting no.: 1
- Conway notation: [3]
- A–B notation: 3_{1}
- Dowker notation: 4, 6, 2
- Last / Next: 0_{1} / 4_{1}

Other
- alternating, torus, fibered, pretzel, prime, knot slice, reversible, tricolorable, twist

In knot theory, a branch of mathematics, the trefoil knot is the simplest example of a nontrivial knot. The trefoil can be obtained by joining the two loose ends of a common overhand knot, resulting in a knotted loop. As the simplest knot, the trefoil is fundamental to the study of mathematical knot theory.

The trefoil knot is named after the three-leaf clover (or trefoil) plant.

== Descriptions ==
The trefoil knot can be defined as the curve obtained from the following parametric equations:

$$\begin{align}
x &= \sin t + 2 \sin 2t \\
y &= \cos t - 2 \cos 2t \\
z &= -\sin 3t
\end{align}$$

The (2,3)-torus knot is also a trefoil knot. The following parametric equations give a (2,3)-torus knot lying on torus $(r-2)^2+z^2 = 1$:

$$\begin{align}
x &= (2+\cos 3t) \cos 2t \\
y &= (2+\cos 3t )\sin 2t \\
z &= \sin 3t
\end{align}$$

Video on making a trefoil knot

Overhand knot becomes a trefoil knot by joining the ends.

A realization of the trefoil knot figure

Any continuous deformation of the curve above is also considered a trefoil knot. Specifically, any curve isotopic to a trefoil knot is also considered to be a trefoil. In addition, the mirror image of a trefoil knot is also considered to be a trefoil. In topology and knot theory, the trefoil is usually defined using a knot diagram instead of an explicit parametric equation.

In algebraic geometry, the trefoil can also be obtained as the intersection in C^{2} of the unit 3-sphere S^{3} with the complex plane curve of zeroes of the complex polynomial z^{2} + w^{3} (a cuspidal cubic).

A left-handed trefoil and a right-handed trefoil

If one end of a tape or belt is turned over three times and then pasted to the other, the edge forms a trefoil knot.

== Symmetry ==
The trefoil knot is chiral, in the sense that a trefoil knot can be distinguished from its own mirror image. The two resulting variants are known as the left-handed trefoil and the right-handed trefoil. It is not possible to deform a left-handed trefoil continuously into a right-handed trefoil, or vice versa. (That is, the two trefoils are not ambient isotopic.)

Though chiral, the trefoil knot is also invertible, meaning that there is no distinction between a counterclockwise-oriented and a clockwise-oriented trefoil. That is, the chirality of a trefoil depends only on the over and under crossings, not the orientation of the curve.

But the knot has rotational symmetry. The axis is about a line perpendicular to the page for the 3-coloured image.

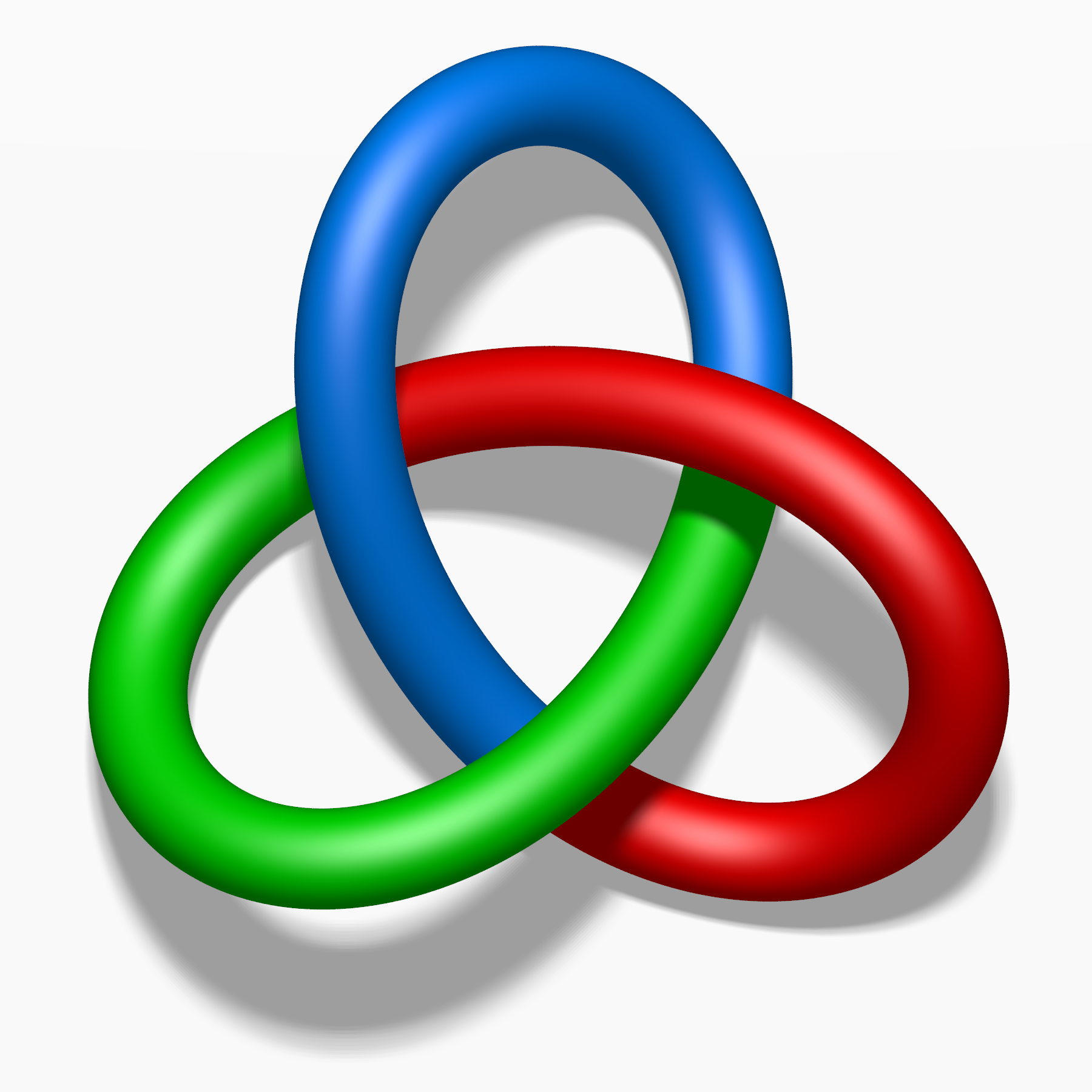
The trefoil knot is tricolorable.

Form of trefoil knot without visual three-fold symmetry

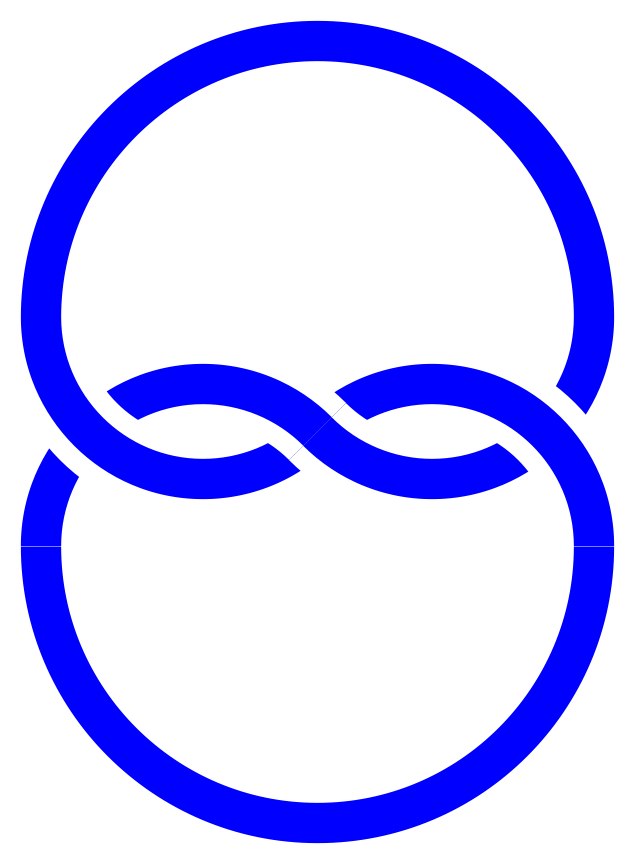
Form of trefoil Knot with two order-2 symmetries

== Nontriviality ==
The trefoil knot is nontrivial, meaning that it is not possible to "untie" a trefoil knot in three dimensions without cutting it. Mathematically, this means that a trefoil knot is not isotopic to the unknot. In particular, there is no sequence of Reidemeister moves that will untie a trefoil.

Proving this requires the construction of a knot invariant that distinguishes the trefoil from the unknot. The simplest such invariant is tricolorability: the trefoil is tricolorable, but the unknot is not. In addition, virtually every major knot polynomial distinguishes the trefoil from an unknot, as do most other strong knot invariants.

== Classification ==
In knot theory, the trefoil is the first nontrivial knot, and is the only knot with crossing number three. It is a prime knot, and is listed as 3_{1} in the Alexander-Briggs notation. The Dowker notation for the trefoil is 4 6 2, and the Conway notation is [3].

The trefoil can be described as the (2,3)-torus knot. It is also the knot obtained by closing the braid σ_{1}^{3}.

The trefoil is an alternating knot. However, it is not a slice knot, meaning it does not bound a smooth 2-dimensional disk in the 4-dimensional ball; one way to prove this is to note that its signature is not zero. Another proof is that its Alexander polynomial does not satisfy the Fox-Milnor condition.

The trefoil is a fibered knot, meaning that its complement in $S^3$ is a fiber bundle over the circle $S^1$. The trefoil K may be viewed as the set of pairs $(z,w)$ of complex numbers such that $|z|^2+|w|^2=1$ and $z^2+w^3=0$. Then this fiber bundle has the Milnor map $\phi(z, w) = (z^2+w^3) / |z^2+w^3|$ as the fibre bundle projection of the knot complement $S^3 \setminus \mathbf{K}$ to the circle $S^1$. The fibre is a once-punctured torus. Since the knot complement is also a Seifert fibred with boundary, it has a horizontal incompressible surface—this is also the fiber of the Milnor map. (This assumes the knot has been thickened to become a solid torus N_{ε}(K), and that the interior of this solid torus has been removed to create a compact knot complement $S^3 \setminus \operatorname{int}(\mathrm{N}_\varepsilon(\mathbf{K})$.)

== Invariants ==
The Alexander polynomial of the trefoil knot is
$$\Delta(t) = t - 1 + t^{-1},$$
since
$$\begin{pmatrix}1 & -1 \\ 0 & 1\end{pmatrix}$$
is a possible Seifert matrix (for the left-hand one), or because of its Conway polynomial, which is
$$\nabla(z) = z^2 + 1.$$
The Jones polynomial is
$$V(q) = q^{-1} + q^{-3} - q^{-4},$$
and the Kauffman polynomial of the trefoil is
$$L(a,z) = za^5 + z^2a^4 - a^4 + za^3 + z^2a^2-2a^2.$$
The HOMFLY polynomial of the trefoil is
$$L(\alpha,z) = -\alpha^4 + \alpha^2z^2 + 2\alpha^2.$$

The knot group of the trefoil is given by the presentation
$$\langle x,y\mid x^2=y^3\rangle,$$
or equivalently
$$\langle x,y \mid xyx=yxy \rangle.$$
This group is isomorphic to the braid group with three strands.

== In religion and culture ==
As the simplest nontrivial knot, the trefoil is a common motif in iconography and the visual arts. For example, the common form of the triquetra symbol is a trefoil, as are some versions of the Germanic Valknut.

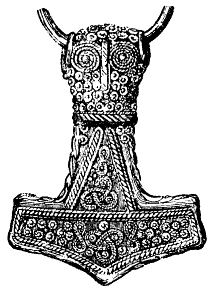
An ancient Norse Mjöllnir pendant with trefoils

A simple triquetra symbol

A tightly-knotted triquetra

The Germanic Valknut

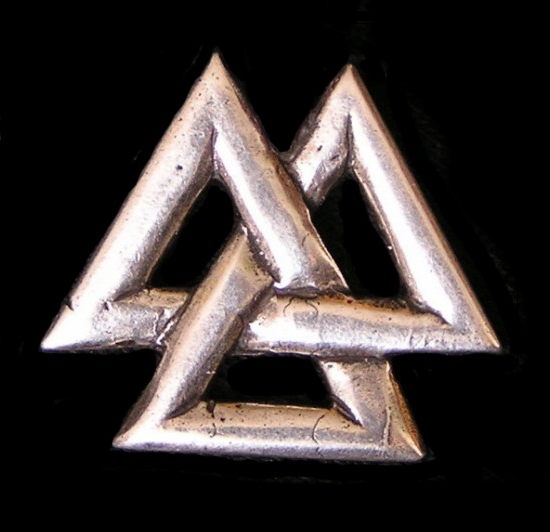
A metallic Valknut in the shape of a trefoil

A Celtic cross with trefoil knots

A Carolingian cross

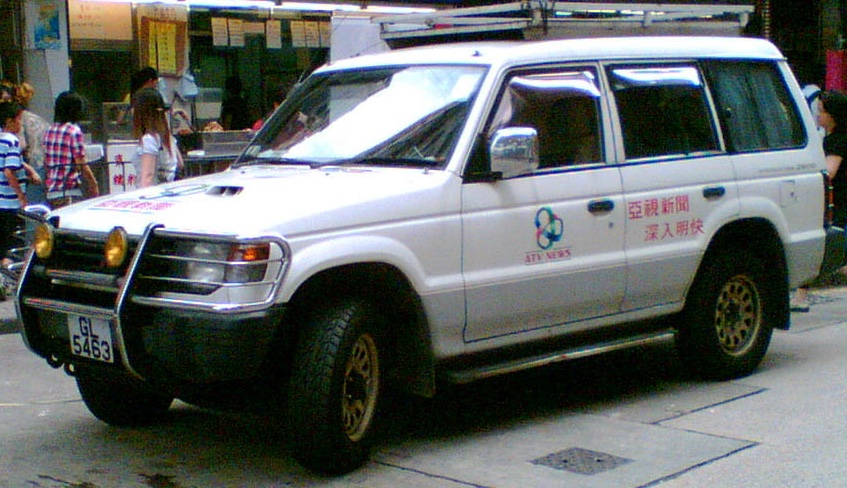
Trefoil knot used in ATV's logo

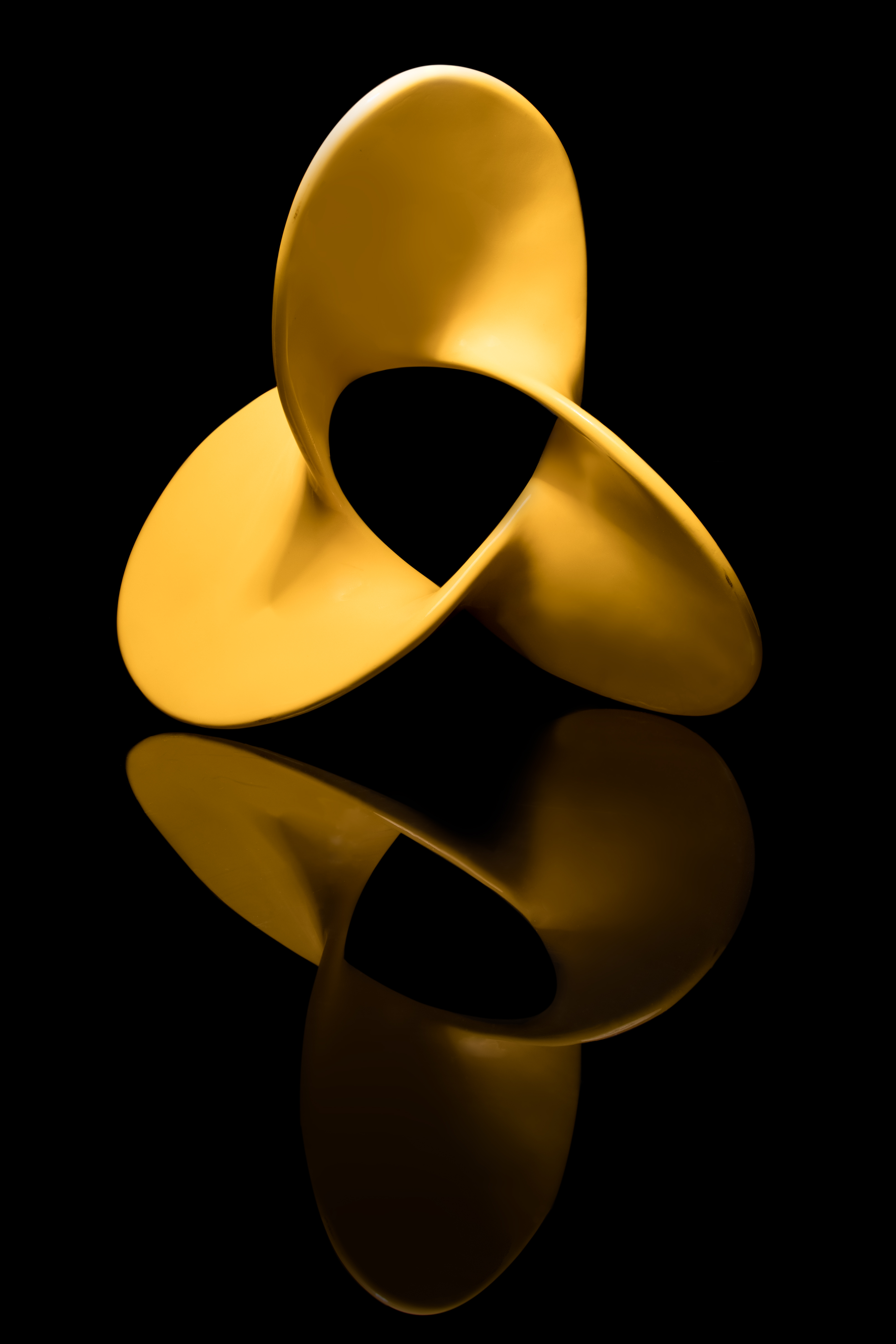
Mathematical surface in which the boundary is the trefoil knot in different angles

In modern art, the woodcut Knots by M. C. Escher (1965) depicts three trefoil knots whose solid forms are twisted in different ways.

== See also ==
- Cinquefoil knot
- Figure-eight knot (mathematics)
- Gordian Knot
- Pretzel link
- Trefoil knot metathesis
- Triquetra symbol
