= Regular isotopy =

Equivalence relation of link diagrams

In the mathematical subject of knot theory, regular isotopy is the equivalence relation of link diagrams that is generated by using the 2nd and 3rd Reidemeister moves only. The notion of regular isotopy was introduced by Louis Kauffman (Kauffman 1990). It can be thought of as an isotopy of a ribbon pressed flat against the plane which keeps the ribbon flat. For diagrams in the plane this is a finer equivalence relation than ambient isotopy of framed links, since the 2nd and 3rd Reidemeister moves preserve the winding number of the diagram (Kauffman 1990, pp. 450ff.). However, for diagrams in the sphere (considered as the plane plus infinity), the two notions are equivalent, due to the extra freedom of passing a strand through infinity.

== See also ==
- Ambient isotopy
- Knot polynomial
