= Knot theory =

Study of mathematical knots

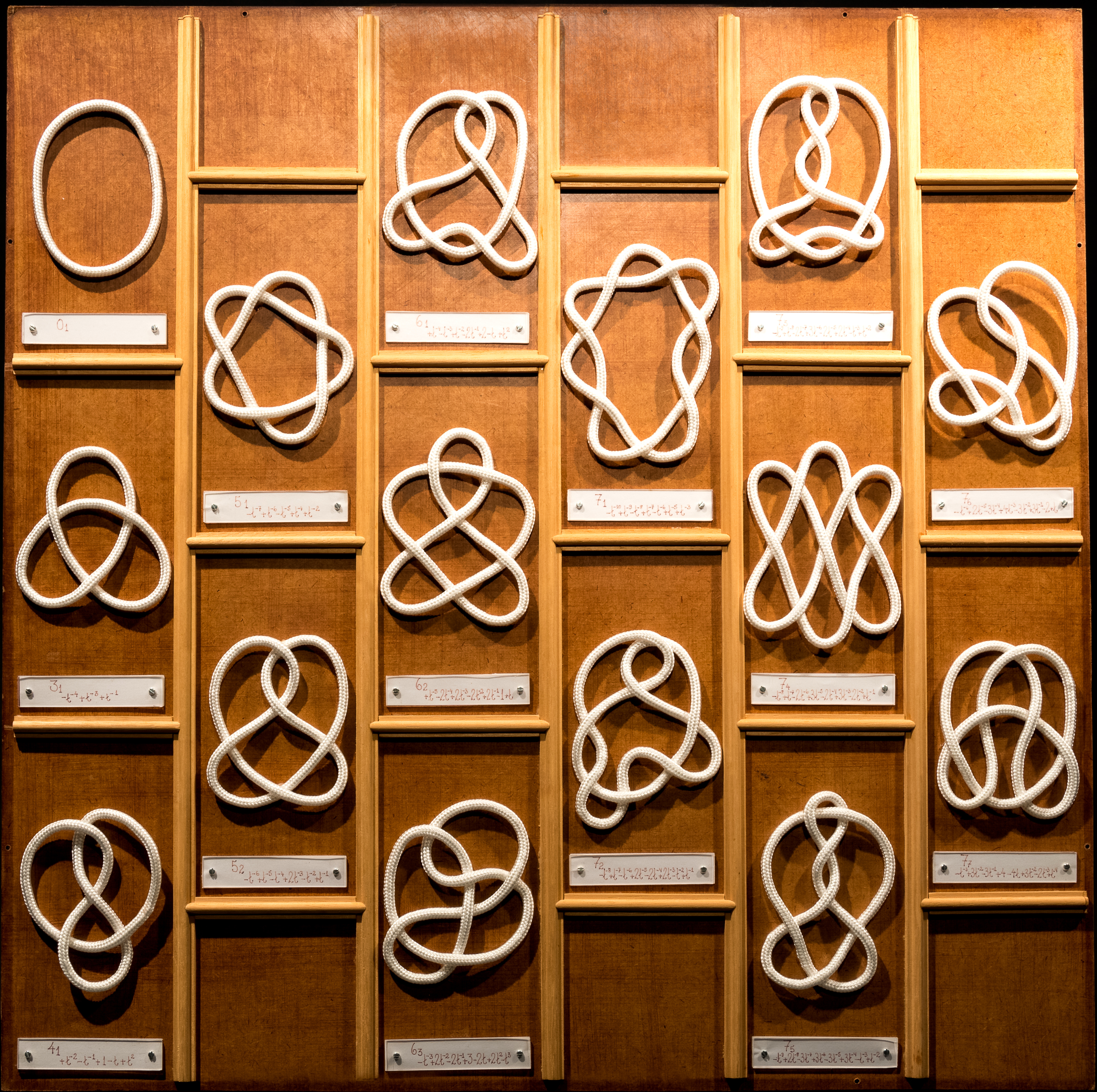
Examples of different knots including the unknot (top left) and the trefoil knot (below it)

A knot diagram of the trefoil knot, the simplest non-trivial knot

In topology, knot theory is the study of mathematical knots. While inspired by knots which appear in daily life, such as those in shoelaces and rope, a mathematical knot differs in that the ends are joined so it cannot be undone, the simplest knot being a ring (or "unknot"). In mathematical language, a knot is an embedding of a circle in 3-dimensional Euclidean space, $\mathbb{E}^3$. Two mathematical knots are equivalent if one can be transformed into the other via a deformation of $\mathbb{R}^3$ upon itself (known as an ambient isotopy); these transformations correspond to manipulations of a knotted string that do not involve cutting it or passing it through itself.

Knots can be described in various ways. Using different description methods, there may be more than one description of the same knot. For example, a common method of describing a knot is a planar diagram called a knot diagram, in which any knot can be drawn in many different ways. Therefore, a fundamental problem in knot theory is determining when two descriptions represent the same knot.

A complete algorithmic solution to this problem exists, which has unknown complexity. In practice, knots are often distinguished using a knot invariant, a "quantity" which is the same when computed from different descriptions of a knot. Important invariants include knot polynomials, knot groups, and hyperbolic invariants.

The original motivation for the founders of knot theory was to create a table of knots and links, which are knots of several components entangled with each other. More than six billion knots and links have been tabulated since the beginnings of knot theory in the 19th century.

To gain further insight, mathematicians have generalized the knot concept in several ways. Knots can be considered in other three-dimensional spaces and objects other than circles can be used; see knot (mathematics). For example, a higher-dimensional knot is an n-dimensional sphere embedded in (n+2)-dimensional Euclidean space. Knot theory can also be extended to describe entanglement in open curves, which is used to study knots in proteins, DNA, and physical ropes.

== History ==
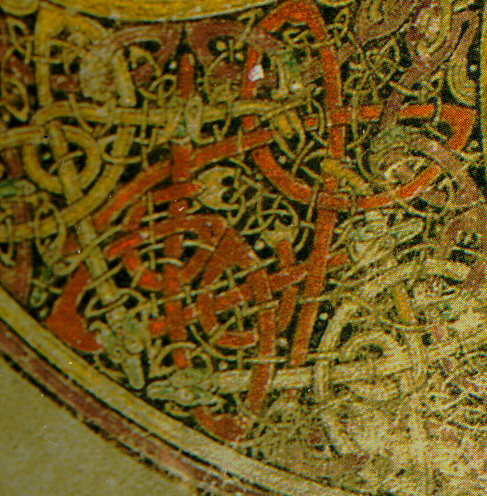
Intricate Celtic knotwork in the 1200-year-old Book of Kells

Archaeologists have discovered that knot tying dates back to prehistoric times. Besides their uses such as recording information and tying objects together, knots have interested humans for their aesthetics and spiritual symbolism. Knots appear in various forms of Chinese artwork dating from several centuries BC (see Chinese knotting). The endless knot appears in Tibetan Buddhism, while the Borromean rings have made repeated appearances in different cultures, often representing strength in unity. The Celtic monks who created the Book of Kells lavished entire pages with intricate Celtic knotwork.

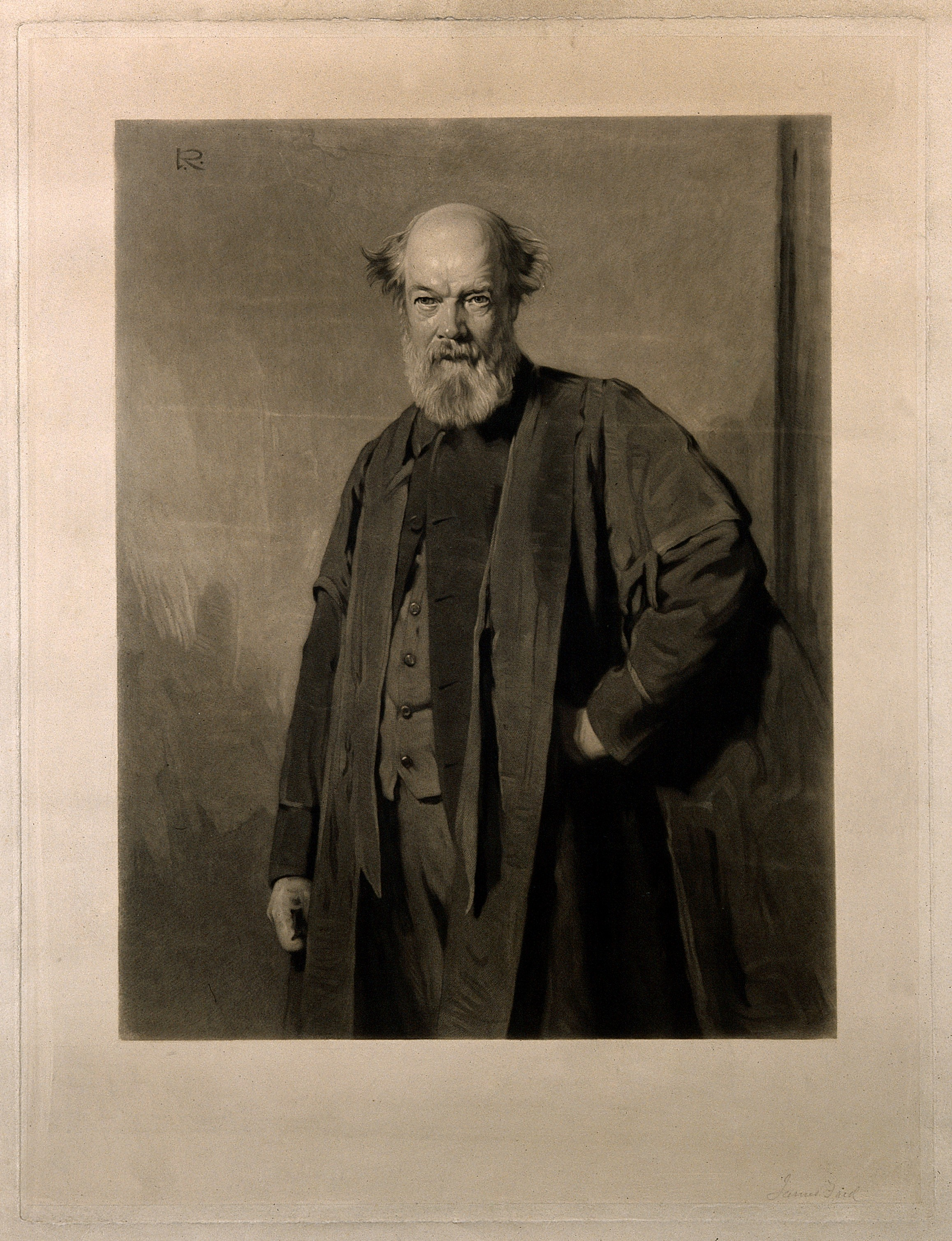
The first knot tabulator, Peter Guthrie Tait

A mathematical theory of knots was first developed in 1771 by Alexandre-Théophile Vandermonde who explicitly noted the importance of topological features when discussing the properties of knots related to the geometry of position. Mathematical studies of knots began in the 19th century with Carl Friedrich Gauss, who defined the linking integral (Silver 2006). In the 1860s, Lord Kelvin's theory that atoms were knots in the aether led to Peter Guthrie Tait's creation of the first knot tables for complete classification. Tait, in 1885, published a table of knots with up to ten crossings, and what came to be known as the Tait conjectures. This record motivated the early knot theorists, but knot theory eventually became part of the emerging subject of topology.

These topologists in the early part of the 20th century—Max Dehn, J. W. Alexander, and others—studied knots from the point of view of the knot group and invariants from homology theory such as the Alexander polynomial. This would be the main approach to knot theory until a series of breakthroughs transformed the subject.

In the late 1970s, William Thurston introduced hyperbolic geometry into the study of knots with the hyperbolization theorem. Many knots were shown to be hyperbolic knots, enabling the use of geometry in defining new, powerful knot invariants. The discovery of the Jones polynomial by Vaughan Jones in 1984 (Sossinsky 2002, pp. 71–89), and subsequent contributions from Edward Witten, Maxim Kontsevich, Louis Kauffman, and others, revealed deep connections between knot theory and mathematical methods in statistical mechanics and quantum field theory. A plethora of knot invariants have been invented since then, utilizing sophisticated tools such as quantum groups and Floer homology.

In the last several decades of the 20th century, scientists became interested in studying physical knots in order to understand knotting phenomena in DNA and other polymers. Knot theory can be used to determine if a molecule is chiral (has a "handedness") or not (Simon 1986). Tangles, strings with both ends fixed in place, have been effectively used in studying the action of topoisomerase on DNA (Flapan 2000). Knot theory may be crucial in the construction of quantum computers, through the model of topological quantum computation (Collins 2006).

== Knot equivalence ==
On the left, the unknot, and a knot equivalent to it. It can be more difficult to determine whether complex knots, such as the one on the right, are equivalent to the unknot.

A knot is created by beginning with a one-dimensional line segment, wrapping it around itself arbitrarily, and then fusing its two free ends together to form a closed loop (Adams 2004) (Sossinsky 2002). Simply, we can say a knot $K$ is a "simple closed curve" (see Curve) — that is: a "nearly" injective and continuous function $K\colon[0,1]\to \mathbb{R}^3$, with the only "non-injectivity" being $K(0)=K(1)$. Topologists consider knots and other entanglements such as links and braids to be equivalent if the knot can be pushed about smoothly, without intersecting itself, to coincide with another knot.

The idea of knot equivalence is to give a precise definition of when two knots should be considered the same even when positioned quite differently in space. A formal mathematical definition is that two knots $K_1, K_2$ are equivalent if there is an orientation-preserving homeomorphism $h\colon\R^3\to\R^3$ with $h(K_1)=K_2$.

What this definition of knot equivalence means is that two knots are equivalent when there is a continuous family of homeomorphisms $\{ h_t: \mathbb R^3 \rightarrow \mathbb R^3\ \mathrm{for}\ 0 \leq t \leq 1\}$ of space onto itself, such that the last one of them carries the first knot onto the second knot. (In detail: Two knots $K_1$ and $K_2$ are equivalent if there exists a continuous mapping $H: \mathbb R^3 \times [0,1] \rightarrow \mathbb R^3$ such that a) for each $t \in [0,1]$ the mapping taking $x \in \mathbb R^3$ to $H(x,t) \in \mathbb R^3$ is a homeomorphism of $\mathbb R^3$ onto itself; b) $H(x, 0) = x$ for all $x \in \mathbb R^3$; and c) $H(K_1,1) = K_2$. Such a function $H$ is known as an ambient isotopy.)

These two notions of knot equivalence agree exactly about which knots are equivalent: Two knots that are equivalent under the orientation-preserving homeomorphism definition are also equivalent under the ambient isotopy definition, because any orientation-preserving homeomorphism of $\mathbb R^3$ to itself is the final stage of an ambient isotopy starting from the identity. Conversely, two knots equivalent under the ambient isotopy definition are also equivalent under the orientation-preserving homeomorphism definition, because the $t=1$ (final) stage of the ambient isotopy must be an orientation-preserving homeomorphism carrying one knot to the other.

One may try to define knot equivalence based on 'isotopy' instead of the more restricted property of ambient isotopy. That is, two knots are isotopic when there exists a continuous function starting at $t=0$ giving the $K_1$ embedding, ending at $t=1$ giving the $K_2$ embedding, with all intermediate values corresponding to embeddings. However, this definition would make every knot equivalent to the unknot, as the knotted portions can be "contracted" down to a straight line. The problem is that, while continuous, this is not an injective function of the euclidean space that the knot is embedded in. Requiring that the homotopy be through homeomorphisms fixes this problem.

The basic problem of knot theory, the recognition problem, is determining the equivalence of two knots. Algorithms exist to solve this problem, with the first given by Wolfgang Haken in the late 1960s (Hass 1998). Nonetheless, these algorithms can be extremely time-consuming, and a major issue in the theory is to understand how hard this problem really is (Hass 1998). The special case of recognizing the unknot, called the unknotting problem, is of particular interest (Hoste 2005). In February 2021 Marc Lackenby announced a new unknot recognition algorithm that runs in quasi-polynomial time.

== Knot diagrams ==
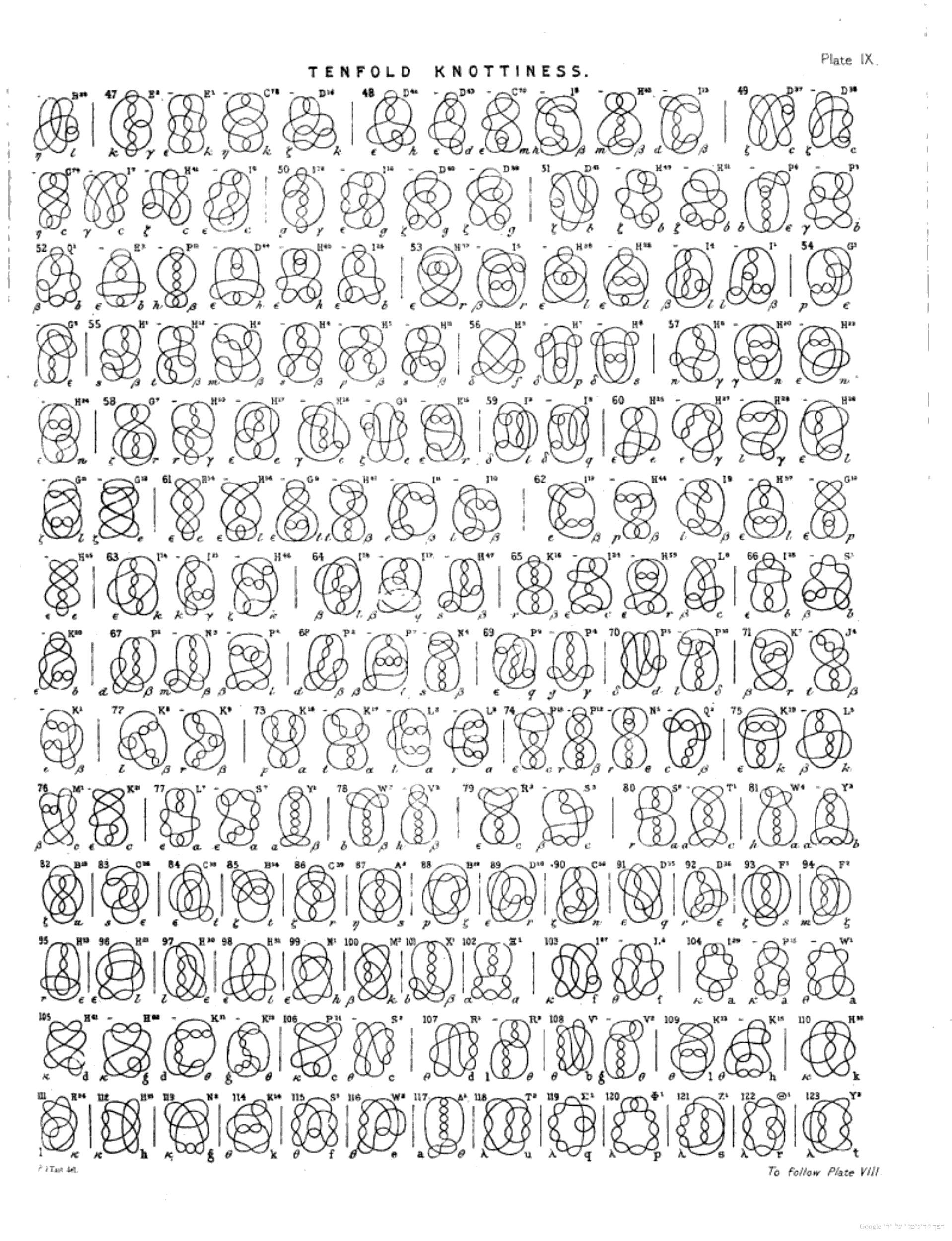
Tenfold Knottiness, plate IX, from Peter Guthrie Tait's article "On Knots", 1884

A useful way to visualise and manipulate knots is to project the knot onto a plane—think of the knot casting a shadow on the wall. A small change in the direction of projection will ensure that it is one-to-one except at the double points, called crossings, where the "shadow" of the knot crosses itself once transversely (Rolfsen 1976). At each crossing, to be able to recreate the original knot, the over-strand must be distinguished from the under-strand. This is often done by creating a break in the strand going underneath. The resulting diagram is an immersed plane curve with the additional data of which strand is over and which is under at each crossing. (These diagrams are called knot diagrams when they represent a knot and link diagrams when they represent a link.) Analogously, knotted surfaces in 4-space can be related to immersed surfaces in 3-space.

A reduced diagram is a knot diagram in which there are no reducible crossings (also nugatory or removable crossings), or in which all of the reducible crossings have been removed. A petal projection is a type of projection in which, instead of forming double points, all strands of the knot meet at a single crossing point, connected to it by loops forming non-nested "petals".

=== Reidemeister moves ===
In 1927, working with this diagrammatic form of knots, J. W. Alexander and Garland Baird Briggs, and independently Kurt Reidemeister, demonstrated that two knot diagrams belonging to the same knot can be related by a sequence of three kinds of moves on the diagram, shown below. These operations, now called the Reidemeister moves, are:

1. Twist and untwist in either direction.
2. Move one strand completely over another.
3. Move a strand completely over or under a crossing.

Reidemeister moves
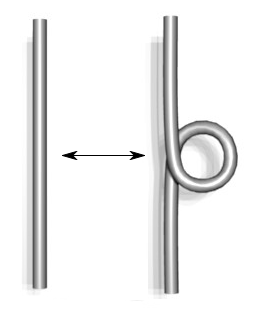
Type I

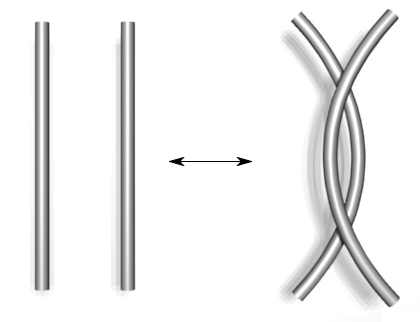
Type II

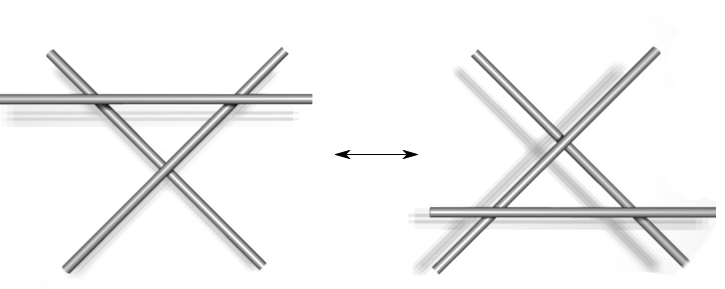
Type III

The proof that diagrams of equivalent knots are connected by Reidemeister moves relies on an analysis of what happens under the planar projection of the movement taking one knot to another. The movement can be arranged so that almost all of the time the projection will be a knot diagram, except at finitely many times when an "event" or "catastrophe" occurs, such as when more than two strands cross at a point or multiple strands become tangent at a point. A close inspection will show that complicated events can be eliminated, leaving only the simplest events: (1) a "kink" forming or being straightened out; (2) two strands becoming tangent at a point and passing through; and (3) three strands crossing at a point. These are precisely the Reidemeister moves (Sossinsky 2002, ch. 3) (Lickorish 1997, ch. 1).

== Knot invariants ==
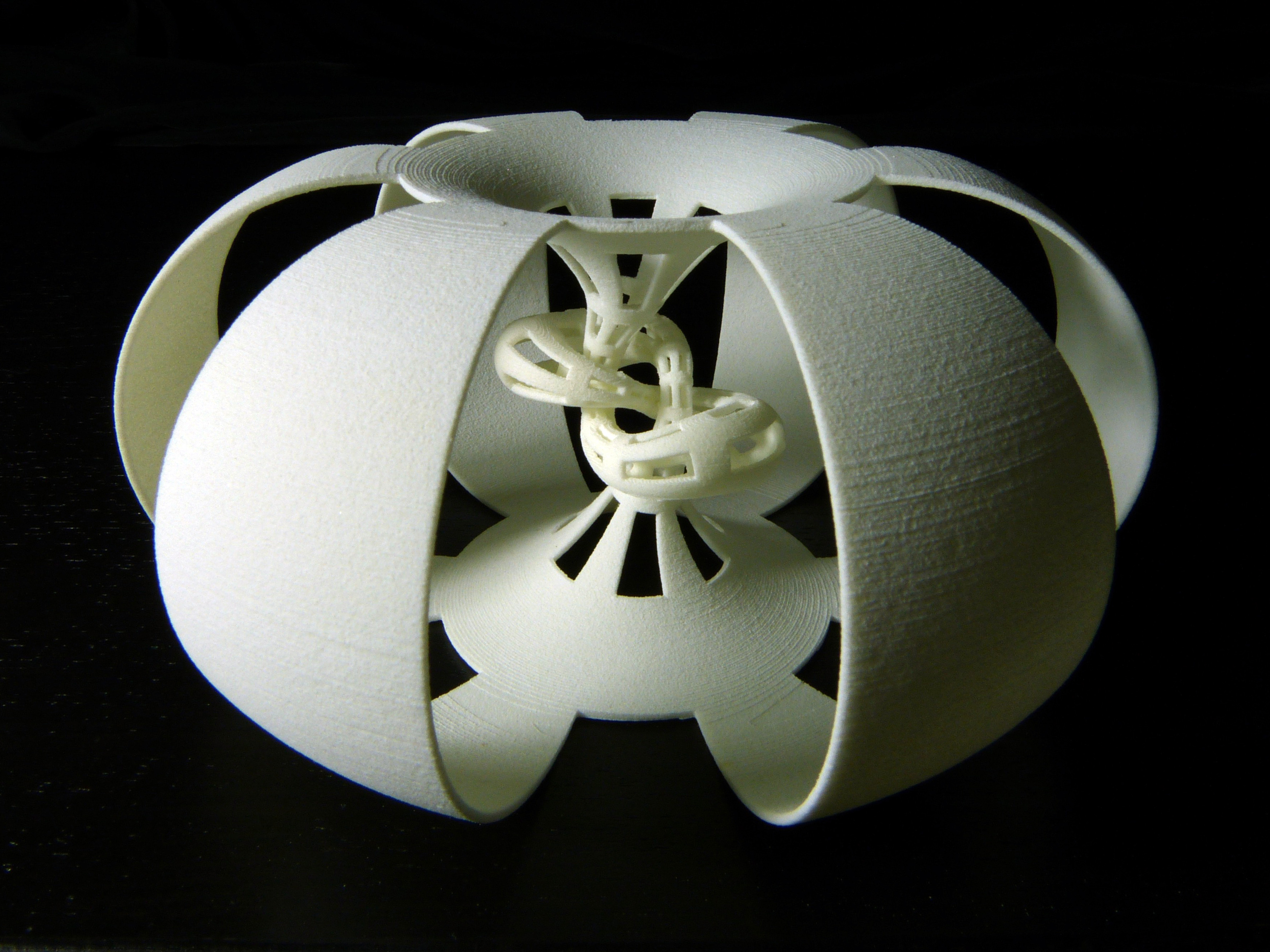
A 3D print depicting the complement of the figure eight knot by François Guéritaud, Saul Schleimer, and Henry Segerman

A knot invariant is a "quantity" that is the same for equivalent knots (Adams 2004) (Lickorish 1997) (Rolfsen 1976). For example, if the invariant is computed from a knot diagram, it should give the same value for two knot diagrams representing equivalent knots. An invariant may take the same value on two different knots, so by itself may be incapable of distinguishing all knots. An elementary invariant is tricolorability.

"Classical" knot invariants include the knot group, which is the fundamental group of the knot complement, and the Alexander polynomial, which can be computed from the Alexander invariant, a module constructed from the infinite cyclic cover of the knot complement (Lickorish 1997)(Rolfsen 1976). In the late 20th century, invariants such as "quantum" knot polynomials, Vassiliev invariants and hyperbolic invariants were discovered. These aforementioned invariants are only the tip of the iceberg of modern knot theory.

=== Knot polynomials ===
A knot polynomial is a knot invariant that is a polynomial. Well-known examples include the Jones polynomial, the Alexander polynomial, and the Kauffman polynomial. A variant of the Alexander polynomial, the Alexander–Conway polynomial, is a polynomial in the variable z with integer coefficients (Lickorish 1997).

The Alexander–Conway polynomial is actually defined in terms of links, which consist of one or more knots entangled with each other. The concepts explained above for knots, e.g. diagrams and Reidemeister moves, also hold for links.

Consider an oriented link diagram, i.e. one in which every component of the link has a preferred direction indicated by an arrow. For a given crossing of the diagram, let $L_+, L_-, L_0$ be the oriented link diagrams resulting from changing the diagram as indicated in the figure:

The original diagram might be either $L_+$ or $L_-$, depending on the chosen crossing's configuration. Then the Alexander–Conway polynomial, $C(z)$, is recursively defined according to the rules:

- $C(O) = 1$ (where $O$ is any diagram of the unknot)
- $C(L_+) = C(L_-) + z C(L_0).$

The second rule is what is often referred to as a skein relation. To check that these rules give an invariant of an oriented link, one should determine that the polynomial does not change under the three Reidemeister moves. Many important knot polynomials can be defined in this way.

The following is an example of a typical computation using a skein relation. It computes the Alexander–Conway polynomial of the trefoil knot. The yellow patches indicate where the relation is applied.

C = C + z C

gives the unknot and the Hopf link. Applying the relation to the Hopf link where indicated,

C = C + z C

gives a link deformable to one with 0 crossings (it is actually the unlink of two components) and an unknot. The unlink takes a bit of sneakiness:

C = C + z C

which implies that C(unlink of two components) = 0, since the first two polynomials are of the unknot and thus equal.

Putting all this together will show:

$$C(\mathrm{trefoil}) = 1 + z(0 + z) = 1 + z^2$$

Since the Alexander–Conway polynomial is a knot invariant, this shows that the trefoil is not equivalent to the unknot. So the trefoil really is "knotted".

The left-handed trefoil knot.

The right-handed trefoil knot.

Actually, there are two trefoil knots, called the right and left-handed trefoils, which are mirror images of each other (take a diagram of the trefoil given above and change each crossing to the other way to get the mirror image). These are not equivalent to each other, meaning that they are not amphichiral. This was shown by Max Dehn, before the invention of knot polynomials, using group theoretical methods (Dehn 1914). But the Alexander–Conway polynomial of each kind of trefoil will be the same, as can be seen by going through the computation above with the mirror image. The Jones polynomial can in fact distinguish between the left- and right-handed trefoil knots (Lickorish 1997).

=== Hyperbolic invariants ===
William Thurston proved many knots are hyperbolic knots, meaning that the knot complement (i.e., the set of points of 3-space not on the knot) admits a geometric structure, in particular that of hyperbolic geometry. The hyperbolic structure depends only on the knot so any quantity computed from the hyperbolic structure is then a knot invariant (Adams 2004).

The Borromean rings are a link with the property that removing one ring unlinks the others.

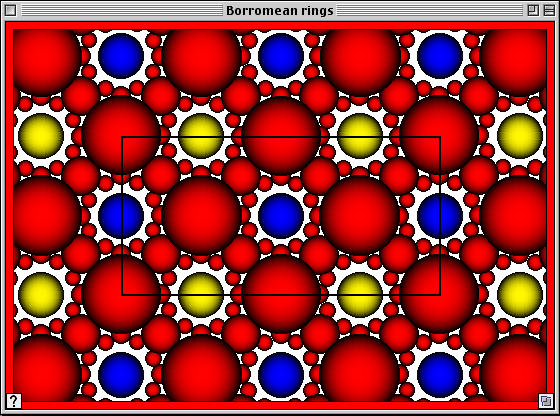
SnapPea's cusp view: the Borromean rings complement from the perspective of an inhabitant living near the red component.

Geometry lets us visualize what the inside of a knot or link complement looks like by imagining light rays as traveling along the geodesics of the geometry. An example is provided by the picture of the complement of the Borromean rings. The inhabitant of this link complement is viewing the space from near the red component. The balls in the picture are views of horoball neighborhoods of the link. By thickening the link in a standard way, the horoball neighborhoods of the link components are obtained. Even though the boundary of a neighborhood is a torus, when viewed from inside the link complement, it looks like a sphere. Each link component shows up as infinitely many spheres (of one color) as there are infinitely many light rays from the observer to the link component. The fundamental parallelogram (which is indicated in the picture), tiles both vertically and horizontally and shows how to extend the pattern of spheres infinitely.

This pattern, the horoball pattern, is itself a useful invariant. Other hyperbolic invariants include the shape of the fundamental parallelogram, length of shortest geodesic, and volume. Modern knot and link tabulation efforts have utilized these invariants effectively. Fast computers and clever methods of obtaining these invariants make calculating these invariants, in practice, a simple task (Adams, Hildebrand & Weeks 1991).

== Higher dimensions ==
A knot in three dimensions can be untied when placed in four-dimensional space. This is done by changing crossings. Suppose one strand is behind another as seen from a chosen point. Lift it into the fourth dimension, so there is no obstacle (the front strand having no component there); then slide it forward, and drop it back, now in front. Analogies for the plane would be lifting a string up off the surface, or removing a dot from inside a circle.

In fact, in four dimensions, any non-intersecting closed loop of one-dimensional string is equivalent to an unknot. First "push" the loop into a three-dimensional subspace, which is always possible, though technical to explain.

Four-dimensional space occurs in classical knot theory, however, and an important topic is the study of slice knots and ribbon knots.

A notorious open problem, often attributed to Ralph Fox, asks whether every slice knot is also ribbon. A knot is considered smoothly slice if it can be the boundary of a disk that is smoothly embedded in a four-dimensional ball. (The adjective "smoothly" is usually assumed, and smoothly slice knots are referred to as slice. There are other types of knots, such as rationally slice, which are not necessarily smoothly slice.) A ribbon knot is one that bounds a disk D immersed in the 3-sphere. All ribbon knots are known to be slice knots.

=== Knotting spheres of higher dimension ===
Since a knot can be considered topologically a 1-dimensional sphere, the next generalization is to consider a two-dimensional sphere ($\mathbb{S}^2$) embedded in 4-dimensional Euclidean space ($\R^4$). Such an embedding is knotted if there is no homeomorphism of $\R^4$ onto itself taking the embedded 2-sphere to the standard "round" embedding of the 2-sphere. Suspended knots and spun knots are two typical families of such 2-sphere knots.

The mathematical technique called "general position" implies that for a given n-sphere in m-dimensional Euclidean space, if m is large enough (depending on n), the sphere should be unknotted. In general, piecewise-linear n-spheres form knots only in (n + 2)-dimensional space (Zeeman 1963), although this is no longer a requirement for smoothly knotted spheres. In fact, there are smoothly knotted $(4k-1)$-spheres in 6k-dimensional space; e.g., there is a smoothly knotted 3-sphere in $\R^6$ (Haefliger 1962) (Levine 1965). Thus the codimension of a smooth knot can be arbitrarily large when not fixing the dimension of the knotted sphere; however, any smooth k-sphere embedded in $\R^n$ with $2n-3k-3>0$ is unknotted. The notion of a knot has further generalisations in mathematics, see: Knot (mathematics), isotopy classification of embeddings.

Every knot in the n-sphere $\mathbb{S}^n$ is the link of a real-algebraic set with isolated singularity in $\R^{n+1}$ (Akbulut & King 1981).

An n-knot is a single $\mathbb{S}^n$ embedded in $\R^m$. An n-link consists of k-copies of $\mathbb{S}^n$ embedded in $\R^m$, where k is a natural number. Both the $m=n+2$ and the $m>n+2$ cases are well studied, and so is the $n>1$ case.

== Adding knots ==
Adding two knots

Two knots can be added by cutting both knots and joining the pairs of ends. The operation is called the knot sum, or sometimes the connected sum or composition of two knots. This can be formally defined as follows (Adams 2004): consider a planar projection of each knot and suppose these projections are disjoint. Find a rectangle in the plane where one pair of opposite sides are arcs along each knot while the rest of the rectangle is disjoint from the knots. Form a new knot by deleting the first pair of opposite sides and adjoining the other pair of opposite sides. The resulting knot is a sum of the original knots. Depending on how this is done, two different knots (but no more) may result. This ambiguity in the sum can be eliminated regarding the knots as oriented, i.e. having a preferred direction of travel along the knot, and requiring the arcs of the knots in the sum are oriented consistently with the oriented boundary of the rectangle.

The knot sum of oriented knots is commutative and associative. A knot is prime if it is non-trivial and cannot be written as the knot sum of two non-trivial knots. A knot that can be written as such a sum is composite. There is a prime decomposition for knots, analogous to prime and composite numbers (Schubert 1949). For oriented knots, this decomposition is also unique. Higher-dimensional knots can also be added but there are some differences. While you cannot form the unknot in three dimensions by adding two non-trivial knots, you can in higher dimensions, at least when one considers smooth knots in codimension at least 3.

Knots can also be constructed using the circuit topology approach. This is done by combining basic units called soft contacts using five operations (Parallel, Series, Cross, Concerted, and Sub). The approach is applicable to open chains as well and can also be extended to include the so-called hard contacts.

== Multiplication of knots ==
In a 2020 article (based on results originally obtained in the 1970s), V. M. Nezhinskij and V. V. Nesterenok introduced a binary operation on the set of oriented knot isotopy classes $\mathcal{K}$, denoted by $[\cdot,\cdot] : \mathcal{K} \times \mathcal{K} \to \mathcal{K}$.

To define the operation for classes $\alpha$ and $\beta$, representatives are chosen in the left and right half-spaces $\mathbb{R}^3_{-}$ and $\mathbb{R}^3_{+}$ respectively, such that their intersections with the separating plane are specific orthogonal segments. A pair of surfaces $V_1$ and $V_2$ cobounding these segments is constructed, and the operation $[\alpha,\beta]$ is defined as the isotopy class of the smoothed boundary of the union $\partial(V_1 \cup V_2)$.

The operation is antisymmetric, satisfying $[\beta,\alpha] = -[\alpha,\beta]$, and it has the standard trivial knot $\omega$ as a right null element: $[\alpha,\omega] = \omega$. A key topological property of this bracket operation is that it produces knots with a trivial Alexander–Conway polynomial; specifically, $\nabla([\alpha,\beta]) = 1$. The article also establishes a relationship between this bracket operation and the HOMFLY-PT polynomial $\mathcal{P}$, expressing $\mathcal{P}([\alpha,\beta])$ as a linear combination of the polynomials of the connected sums and the doubled components $D(\alpha)$ and $D(\beta)$.

== Tabulating knots ==
A table of prime knots up to seven crossings. The knots are labeled with Alexander–Briggs notation

Traditionally, knots have been catalogued in terms of crossing number. Knot tables generally include only prime knots, and only one entry for a knot and its mirror image (even if they are different) (Hoste, Thistlethwaite & Weeks 1998). The number of nontrivial knots of a given crossing number increases rapidly, making tabulation computationally difficult (Hoste 2005, p. 20). Tabulation efforts have succeeded in enumerating over 6 billion knots and links (Hoste 2005, p. 28). The sequence of the number of prime knots of a given crossing number, up to crossing number 16, is 0, 0, 1, 1, 2, 3, 7, 21, 49, 165, 552, 2176, 9988, 46972, 253293, 1388705... (sequence A002863 in the OEIS). While exponential upper and lower bounds for this sequence are known, it has not been proven that this sequence is strictly increasing (Adams 2004).

The first knot tables by Tait, Little, and Kirkman used knot diagrams, although Tait also used a precursor to the Dowker notation. Different notations have been invented for knots which allow more efficient tabulation (Hoste 2005).

The early tables attempted to list all knots of at most 10 crossings, and all alternating knots of 11 crossings (Hoste, Thistlethwaite & Weeks 1998). The development of knot theory due to Alexander, Reidemeister, Seifert, and others eased the task of verification and tables of knots up to and including 9 crossings were published by Alexander–Briggs and Reidemeister in the late 1920s.

The first major verification of this work was done in the 1960s by John Horton Conway, who not only developed a new notation but also the Alexander–Conway polynomial (Conway 1970) (Doll & Hoste 1991). This verified the list of knots of at most 11 crossings and a new list of links up to 10 crossings. Conway found a number of omissions but only one duplication in the Tait–Little tables; however he missed the duplicates called the Perko pair, which would only be noticed in 1974 by Kenneth Perko (Perko 1974). This famous error would propagate when Dale Rolfsen added a knot table in his influential text, based on Conway's work. Conway's 1970 paper on knot theory also contains a typographical duplication on its non-alternating 11-crossing knots page and omits 4 examples — 2 previously listed in D. Lombardero's 1968 Princeton senior thesis and 2 more subsequently discovered by Alain Caudron. [see Perko (1982), Primality of certain knots, Topology Proceedings] Less famous is the duplicate in his 10 crossing link table: 2.-2.-20.20 is the mirror of 8*-20:-20. [See Perko (2016), Historical highlights of non-cyclic knot theory, J. Knot Theory Ramifications].

In the late 1990s Hoste, Thistlethwaite, and Weeks tabulated all the knots through 16 crossings (Hoste, Thistlethwaite & Weeks 1998). In 2003 Rankin, Flint, and Schermann, tabulated the alternating knots through 22 crossings (Hoste 2005). In 2020 Burton tabulated all prime knots with up to 19 crossings (Burton 2020).

=== Alexander–Briggs notation ===
This is the most traditional notation, due to the 1927 paper of James W. Alexander and Garland B. Briggs and later extended by Dale Rolfsen in his knot table (see image above and List of prime knots). The notation simply organizes knots by their crossing number. One writes the crossing number with a subscript to denote its order amongst all knots with that crossing number. This order is arbitrary and so has no special significance (though in each number of crossings the twist knot comes after the torus knot). Links are written by the crossing number with a superscript to denote the number of components and a subscript to denote its order within the links with the same number of components and crossings. Thus the trefoil knot is notated 3_{1} and the Hopf link is 2^{2}_{1}. Alexander–Briggs names in the range 10_{162} to 10_{166} are ambiguous, due to the discovery of the Perko pair in Charles Newton Little's original and subsequent knot tables, and differences in approach to correcting this error in knot tables and other publications created after this point.

=== Dowker–Thistlethwaite notation ===
A knot diagram with crossings labelled for a Dowker sequence

The Dowker–Thistlethwaite notation, also called the Dowker notation or code, for a knot is a finite sequence of even integers. The numbers are generated by following the knot and marking the crossings with consecutive integers. Since each crossing is visited twice, this creates a pairing of even integers with odd integers. An appropriate sign is given to indicate over and undercrossing. For example, in this figure the knot diagram has crossings labelled with the pairs (1,6) (3,−12) (5,2) (7,8) (9,−4) and (11,−10). The Dowker–Thistlethwaite notation for this labelling is the sequence: 6, −12, 2, 8, −4, −10. A knot diagram has more than one possible Dowker notation, and there is a well-understood ambiguity when reconstructing a knot from a Dowker–Thistlethwaite notation.

=== Conway notation ===
The Conway notation for knots and links, named after John Horton Conway, is based on the theory of tangles (Conway 1970). The advantage of this notation is that it reflects some properties of the knot or link.

The notation describes how to construct a particular link diagram of the link. Start with a basic polyhedron, a 4-valent connected planar graph with no digon regions. Such a polyhedron is denoted first by the number of vertices then a number of asterisks which determine the polyhedron's position on a list of basic polyhedra. For example, 10** denotes the second 10-vertex polyhedron on Conway's list.

Each vertex then has an algebraic tangle substituted into it (each vertex is oriented so there is no arbitrary choice in substitution). Each such tangle has a notation consisting of numbers and + or − signs.

An example is 1*2 −3 2. The 1* denotes the only 1-vertex basic polyhedron. The 2 −3 2 is a sequence describing the continued fraction associated to a rational tangle. One inserts this tangle at the vertex of the basic polyhedron 1*.

A more complicated example is 8*3.1.2 0.1.1.1.1.1 Here again 8* refers to a basic polyhedron with 8 vertices. The periods separate the notation for each tangle.

Any link admits such a description, and it is clear this is a very compact notation even for very large crossing number. There are some further shorthands usually used. The last example is usually written 8*3:2 0, where the ones are omitted and kept the number of dots excepting the dots at the end. For an algebraic knot such as in the first example, 1* is often omitted.

Conway's pioneering paper on the subject lists up to 10-vertex basic polyhedra of which he uses to tabulate links, which have become standard for those links. For a further listing of higher vertex polyhedra, there are nonstandard choices available.

=== Gauss code ===
Gauss code, similar to the Dowker–Thistlethwaite notation, represents a knot with a sequence of integers. However, rather than every crossing being represented by two different numbers, crossings are labeled with only one number. When the crossing is an overcrossing, a positive number is listed. At an undercrossing, a negative number. For example, the trefoil knot in Gauss code can be given as: 1,−2,3,−1,2,−3

Gauss code is limited in its ability to identify knots. This problem is partially addressed with by the extended Gauss code.

== Knots with intra-chain bonds ==
While classical knot theory classifies embeddings via crossings, many naturally occurring folded chains include chain crossings along with intra-chain bonds not captured by traditional knot theoretic methods, and are primarily studied by Circuit topology. In 2019, Alireza Mashaghi and Colin Adams extended knot theory to 3D embeddings of linear chains with intra-chain bonds. They introduced generalized Reidemeister moves, adapted Gauss codes, and "bondles" (bonded quandles) as invariants to classify self-interacting open chains, revealing a richer knot hierarchy beyond classical invariants.

== Applications ==
Beyond pure mathematics, knot theory has found significant applications in a variety of scientific fields. In chemistry, it provides a framework for studying the chirality of molecules and for describing topologically non‑trivial structures such as catenanes and molecular knots, where the knottedness of the molecular backbone influences physical and chemical properties. In molecular biology, knot theory is used to analyze the action of enzymes like topoisomerases, which alter the linking number and supercoiling of DNA, and to model processes such as recombination and replication of circular DNA. In physics, knot invariants arise naturally in topological quantum field theory—for instance, the Jones polynomial emerges from Chern–Simons theory—and knot theoretic ideas are employed in the study of vortex dynamics, cosmic strings, and certain statistical mechanics models. More recently, methods from knot theory have been applied to quantum computing, where braid group representations serve as a model for topological qubits, and to materials science in the design of novel polymers and mechanical metamaterials. In archaeology, several basic knot theory ideas, such as chirality, prime knots, and ambient isotopy, have helped provide a framework for better understanding and studying knotted technologies used by people in the past, like that of the Andean quipu.

== See also ==
- Circuit topology
- Lamp cord trick
- Legendrian knot
- Link (knot theory)
- List of knot theory topics
- Molecular knot
- Necktie § Knots
- Quantum topology
- Ribbon theory
