= Ambient isotopy =

Concept in topology

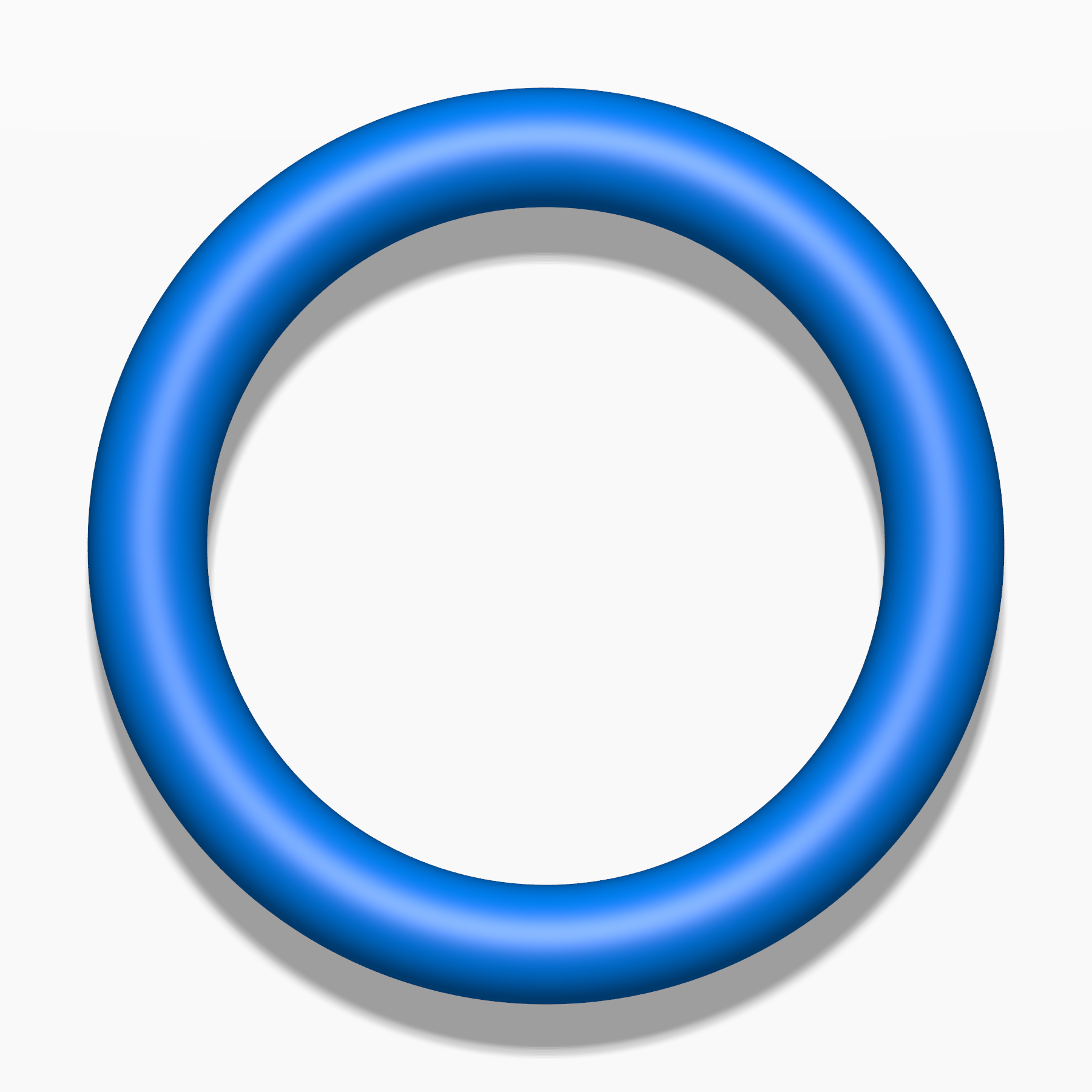
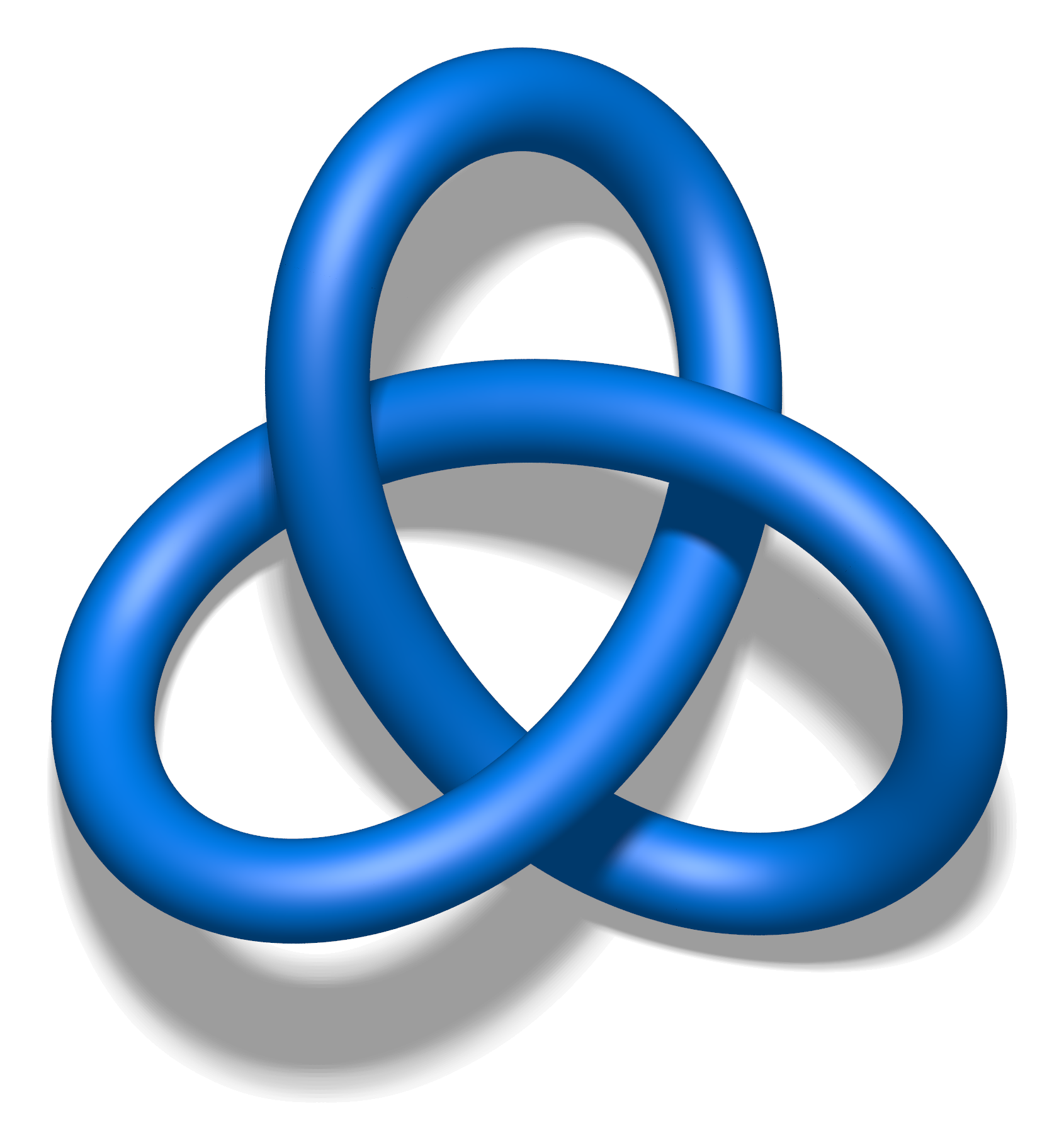
In $\mathbb{R}^3$, the unknot is not ambient-isotopic to the trefoil knot since one cannot be deformed into the other through a continuous path of homeomorphisms of the ambient space. They are ambient-isotopic in $\mathbb{R}^4$.

In the mathematical subject of topology, an ambient isotopy, also called an h-isotopy, is a kind of continuous distortion of an ambient space, for example a manifold, taking a submanifold to another submanifold. For example in knot theory, one considers two knots the same if one can distort one knot into the other without breaking it. Such a distortion is an example of an ambient isotopy.

More precisely, let $N$ and $M$ be manifolds and $g$ and $h$ be embeddings of $N$ in $M$. A continuous map
$$F:M \times [0,1] \rightarrow M$$
is defined to be an ambient isotopy taking $g$ to $h$ if each $F_t: M \rightarrow M, F_t(\cdot) = F(\cdot, t)$ is a homeomorphism from $M$ to itself, $F_0$ is the identity map and $F_1 \circ g = h$. This implies that the orientation must be preserved by ambient isotopies. For example, two knots that are mirror images of each other are, in general, not equivalent.

== See also ==
- Isotopy
- Regular homotopy
- Regular isotopy
