= Knot invariant =

Function of a knot that takes the same value for equivalent knots

Prime knots are organized by the crossing number invariant.

In the mathematical field of knot theory, a knot invariant is a quantity (in a broad sense) defined for each knot which is the same for equivalent knots. The equivalence is often given by ambient isotopy but can be given by homeomorphism. Some invariants are indeed numbers (algebraic), but invariants can range from the simple, such as a yes/no answer, to those as complex as a homology theory (for example, "a knot invariant is a rule that assigns to any knot K a quantity φ(K) such that if K and K' are equivalent then φ(K) = φ(K')."). Research on invariants is not only motivated by the basic problem of distinguishing one knot from another but also to understand fundamental properties of knots and their relations to other branches of mathematics. Knot invariants are thus used in knot classification, both in "enumeration" and "duplication removal".

A knot invariant is a quantity defined on the set of all knots, which takes the same value for any two equivalent knots. For example, a knot group is a knot invariant.

== General properties ==
Typically a knot invariant is a combinatorial quantity defined on knot diagrams. Thus if two knot diagrams differ with respect to some knot invariant, they must represent different knots. However, as is generally the case with topological invariants, if two knot diagrams share the same values with respect to a [single] knot invariant, then we still cannot conclude that the knots are the same.

== Invariants from knot diagrams ==
From the modern perspective, it is natural to define a knot invariant from a knot diagram. Of course, it must be unchanged (that is to say, invariant) under the Reidemeister moves ("triangular moves"). Tricolorability (and n-colorability) is a particularly simple and common example. Other examples are knot polynomials, such as the Jones polynomial, which are currently among the most useful invariants for distinguishing knots from one another, though currently it is not known whether there exists a knot polynomial which distinguishes all knots from each other. However, there are invariants which distinguish the unknot from all other knots, such as Khovanov homology and knot Floer homology.

== Extremal diagram invariants ==
Other invariants can be defined by considering some integer-valued function of knot diagrams and taking its minimum value over all possible diagrams of a given knot. This category includes the crossing number, which is the minimum number of crossings for any diagram of the knot, and the bridge number, which is the minimum number of bridges for any diagram of the knot.

== Classical and intrinsic invariants ==
Historically, many of the early knot invariants are not defined by first selecting a diagram but defined intrinsically, which can make computing some of these invariants a challenge. For example, knot genus is particularly tricky to compute, but can be effective (for instance, in distinguishing mutants).

== Complete invariants ==
The complement of a knot itself (as a topological space) is known to be a "complete invariant" of the knot by the Gordon–Luecke theorem in the sense that it distinguishes the given knot from all other knots up to ambient isotopy and mirror image. Some invariants associated with the knot complement include the knot group which is just the fundamental group of the complement. The knot quandle is also a complete invariant in this sense but it is difficult to determine if two quandles are isomorphic. The peripheral subgroup can also work as a complete invariant.

== Hyperbolic invariants ==
By Mostow–Prasad rigidity, the hyperbolic structure on the complement of a hyperbolic link is unique, which means the hyperbolic volume is an invariant for these knots and links. Volume, and other hyperbolic invariants, have proven very effective, utilized in some of the extensive efforts at knot tabulation.

== Homological invariants ==
In recent years, there has been much interest in homological invariants of knots which categorify well-known invariants. Heegaard Floer homology is a homology theory whose Euler characteristic is the Alexander polynomial of the knot. It has been proven effective in deducing new results about the classical invariants. Along a different line of study, there is a combinatorially defined cohomology theory of knots called Khovanov homology whose Euler characteristic is the Jones polynomial. This has recently been shown to be useful in obtaining bounds on slice genus whose earlier proofs required gauge theory. Mikhail Khovanov and Lev Rozansky have since defined several other related cohomology theories whose Euler characteristics recover other classical invariants. Catharina Stroppel gave a representation theoretic interpretation of Khovanov homology by categorifying quantum group invariants.

== Physical and geometric invariants ==
There is also growing interest from both knot theorists and scientists in understanding "physical" or geometric properties of knots and relating it to topological invariants and knot type. An old result in this direction is the Fáry–Milnor theorem states that if the total curvature of a knot K in $\R^3$ satisfies

$$\oint_K \kappa \,ds \leq 4\pi,$$

where κ(p) is the curvature at p, then K is an unknot. Therefore, for knotted curves,

$$\oint_K \kappa\,ds > 4\pi.\,$$

An example of a "physical" invariant is ropelength, which is the length of unit-diameter rope needed to realize a particular knot type.

== Other invariants ==
- Linking number – How many times curves wind around each other
- Finite type invariant – Type of invariant in Knot theory (or Vassiliev or Vassiliev–Goussarov invariant)
- Stick number – Smallest number of edges of an equivalent polygonal path for a knot
- Arnold invariants – Mathematical invariants used to classify plane curves
