= Peripheral subgroup =

In algebraic topology, a peripheral subgroup for a space-subspace pair X ⊃ Y is a certain subgroup of the fundamental group of the complementary space, π_{1}(X − Y). Its conjugacy class is an invariant of the pair (X,Y). That is, any homeomorphism (X, Y) → (X′, Y′) induces an isomorphism π_{1}(X − Y) → π_{1}(X′ − Y′) taking peripheral subgroups to peripheral subgroups.

A peripheral subgroup consists of loops in X − Y which are peripheral to Y, that is, which stay "close to" Y (except when passing to and from the basepoint). When an ordered set of generators for a peripheral subgroup is specified, the subgroup and generators are collectively called a peripheral system for the pair (X, Y).

Peripheral systems are used in knot theory as a complete algebraic invariant of knots. There is a systematic way to choose generators for a peripheral subgroup of a knot in 3-space, such that distinct knot types always have algebraically distinct peripheral systems. The generators in this situation are called a longitude and a meridian of the knot complement.

== Full definition ==
Peripheral loops live in U ∪ γ

Let Y be a subspace of the path-connected topological space X, whose complement X − Y is path-connected. Fix a basepoint x ∈ X − Y. For each path component V_{i} of X̅ − Y̅∩Y̅, choose a path γ_{i} from x to a point in V_{i}. An element [α] ∈ π_{1}(X − Y, x) is called peripheral with respect to this choice if it is represented by a loop in U ∪ ∪ _{i}γ_{i} for every neighborhood U of Y. The set of all peripheral elements with respect to a given choice forms a subgroup of π_{1}(X − Y, x), called a peripheral subgroup.

In the diagram, a peripheral loop would start at the basepoint x and travel down the path γ until it's inside the neighborhood U of the subspace Y. Then it would move around through U however it likes (avoiding Y). Finally it would return to the basepoint x via γ. Since U can be a very tight envelope around Y, the loop has to stay close to Y.

Any two peripheral subgroups of π_{1}(X − Y, x), resulting from different choices of paths γ_{i}, are conjugate in π_{1}(X − Y, x). Also, every conjugate of a peripheral subgroup is itself peripheral with respect to some choice of paths γ_{i}. Thus the peripheral subgroup's conjugacy class is an invariant of the pair (X, Y).

A peripheral subgroup, together with an ordered set of generators, is called a peripheral system for the pair (X, Y). If a systematic method is specified for selecting these generators, the peripheral system is, in general, a stronger invariant than the peripheral subgroup alone. In fact, it is a complete invariant for knots.

== In knot theory ==
Peripheral loops live in γ union the tube.

The peripheral subgroups for a tame knot K in R^{3} are isomorphic to Z ⊕ Z if the knot is nontrivial, Z if it is the unknot. They are generated by two elements, called a longitude [l] and a meridian [m]. (If K is the unknot, then [l] is a power of [m], and a peripheral subgroup is generated by [m] alone.) A longitude is a loop that runs from the basepoint x along a path γ to a point y on the boundary of a tubular neighborhood of K, then follows along the tube, making one full lap to return to y, then returns to x via γ. A meridian is a loop that runs from x to y, then circles around the tube, returns to y, then returns to x. (The property of being a longitude or meridian is well-defined because the tubular neighborhoods of a tame knot are all ambiently isotopic.) Note that every knot group has a longitude and meridian; if [l] and [m] are a longitude and meridian in a given peripheral subgroup, then so are [l]·[m]^{n} and [m]^{−1}, respectively (n ∈ Z). In fact, these are the only longitudes and meridians in the subgroup, and any pair will generate the subgroup.

A peripheral system for a knot can be selected by choosing generators [l] and [m] such that the longitude l has linking number 0 with K, and the ordered triple (m′,l′,n) is a positively oriented basis for R^{3}, where m′ is the tangent vector of m based at y, l′ is the tangent vector of l based at y, and n is an outward-pointing normal to the tube at y. (Assume that representatives l and m are chosen to be smooth on the tube and cross only at y.) If so chosen, the peripheral system is a complete invariant for knots, as proven in [Waldhausen 1968].

A square knot (left) and a granny knot (right).

=== Example: Square knot versus granny knot ===
The square knot and the granny knot are distinct knots, and have non-homeomorphic complements. However, their knot groups are isomorphic. Nonetheless, it was shown in [Fox 1961] that no isomorphism of their knot groups carries a peripheral subgroup of one to a peripheral subgroup of the other. Thus the peripheral subgroup is sufficient to distinguish these knots.

A trefoil and a mirror trefoil.

=== Example: Trefoil versus mirror trefoil ===
The trefoil and its mirror image are distinct knots, and consequently there is no orientation-preserving homeomorphism between their complements. However, there is an orientation-reversing self-homeomorphism of R^{3} that carries the trefoil to its mirror image. This homeomorphism induces an isomorphism of the knot groups, carrying a peripheral subgroup to a peripheral subgroup, a longitude to a longitude, and a meridian to a meridian. Thus the peripheral subgroup is not sufficient to distinguish these knots. Nonetheless, it was shown in [Dehn 1914] that no isomorphism of these knot groups preserves the peripheral system selected as described above. An isomorphism will, at best, carry one generator to a generator going the "wrong way". Thus the peripheral system can distinguish these knots.

=== Wirtinger presentation ===
It is possible to express longitudes and meridians of a knot as words in the Wirtinger presentation of the knot group, without reference to the knot itself.
