= Lissajous knot =

Knot defined by parametric equations defining Lissajous curves

In knot theory, a Lissajous knot is a knot defined by parametric equations of the form

$$x = \cos(n_x t + \phi_x),\qquad  y = \cos(n_y t + \phi_y), \qquad  z = \cos(n_z t + \phi_z),$$

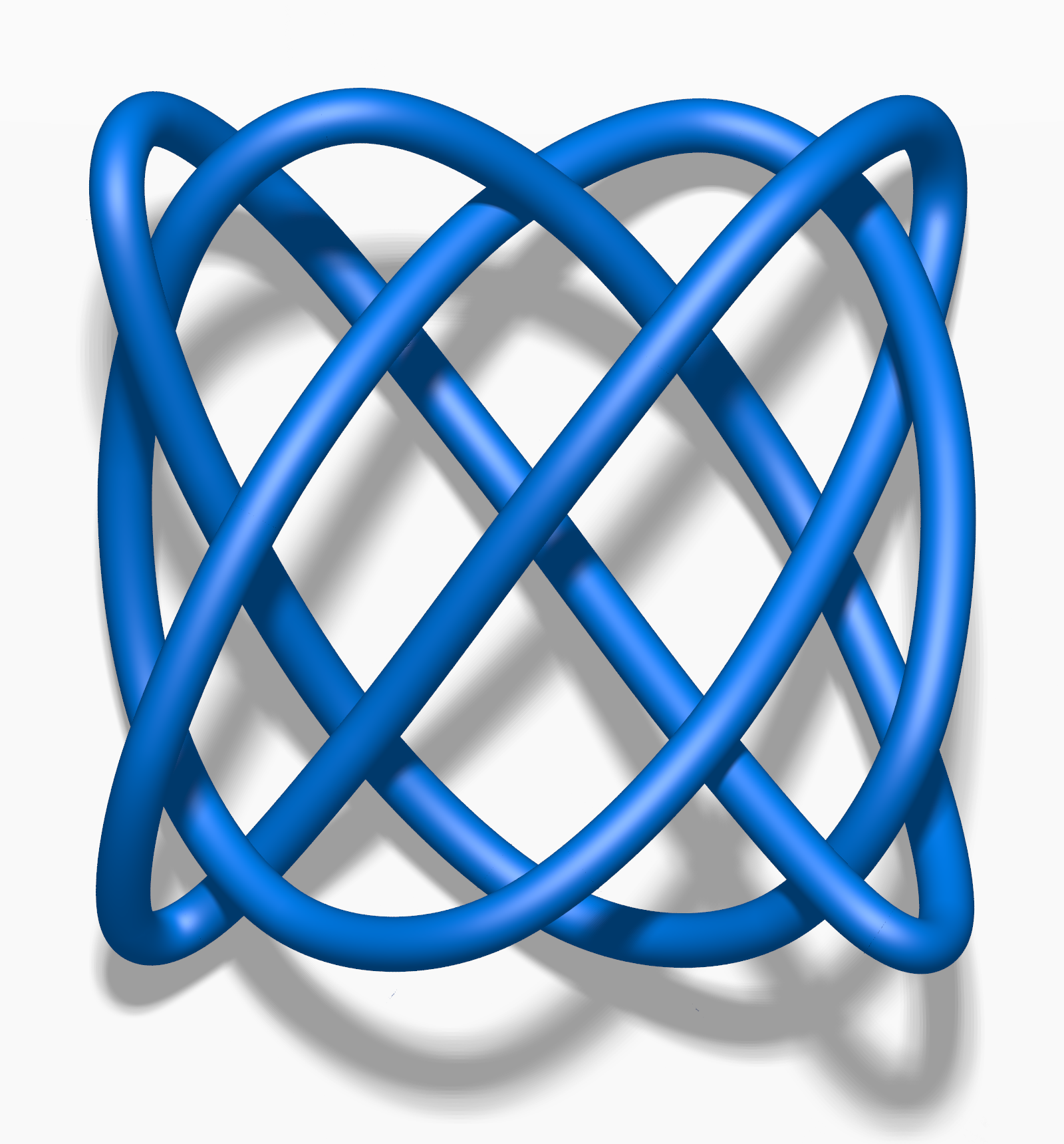
A Lissajous 8_{21} knot

where $n_x$, $n_y$, and $n_z$ are integers and the phase shifts $\phi_x$, $\phi_y$, and $\phi_z$ may be any real numbers.

The projection of a Lissajous knot onto any of the three coordinate planes is a Lissajous curve, and many of the properties of these knots are closely related to properties of Lissajous curves.

Replacing the cosine function in the parametrization by a triangle wave transforms every Lissajous knot isotopically into a billiard curve inside a cube, the simplest case of so-called billiard knots. Billiard knots can also be studied in other domains, for instance in a cylinder or in a (flat) solid torus (Lissajous-toric knot).

== Form ==
Because a knot cannot be self-intersecting, the three integers $n_x, n_y, n_z$ must be pairwise relatively prime, and none of the quantities

$$n_x \phi_y - n_y \phi_x,\quad  n_y \phi_z - n_z \phi_y,\quad n_z \phi_x - n_x \phi_z$$

may be an integer multiple of pi. Moreover, by making a substitution of the form $t' = t+c$, one may assume that any of the three phase shifts $\phi_x$, $\phi_y$, $\phi_z$ is equal to zero.

== Examples ==
Here are some examples of Lissajous knots, all of which have $\phi_z=0$:

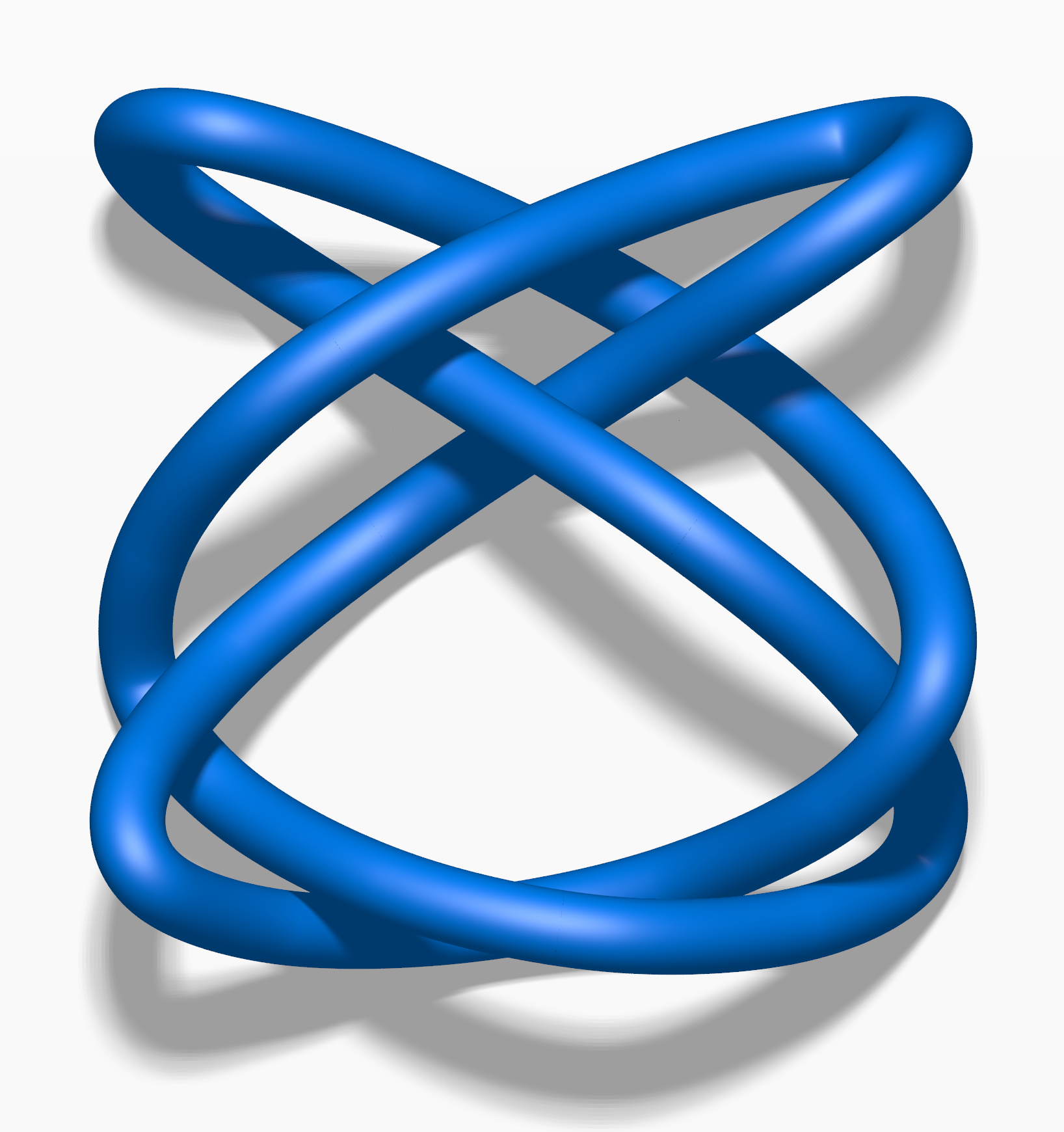
Three-twist knot
$(n_x,n_y,n_z)=(3,2,7)$
$(\phi_x,\phi_y)=(0.7,0.2)$

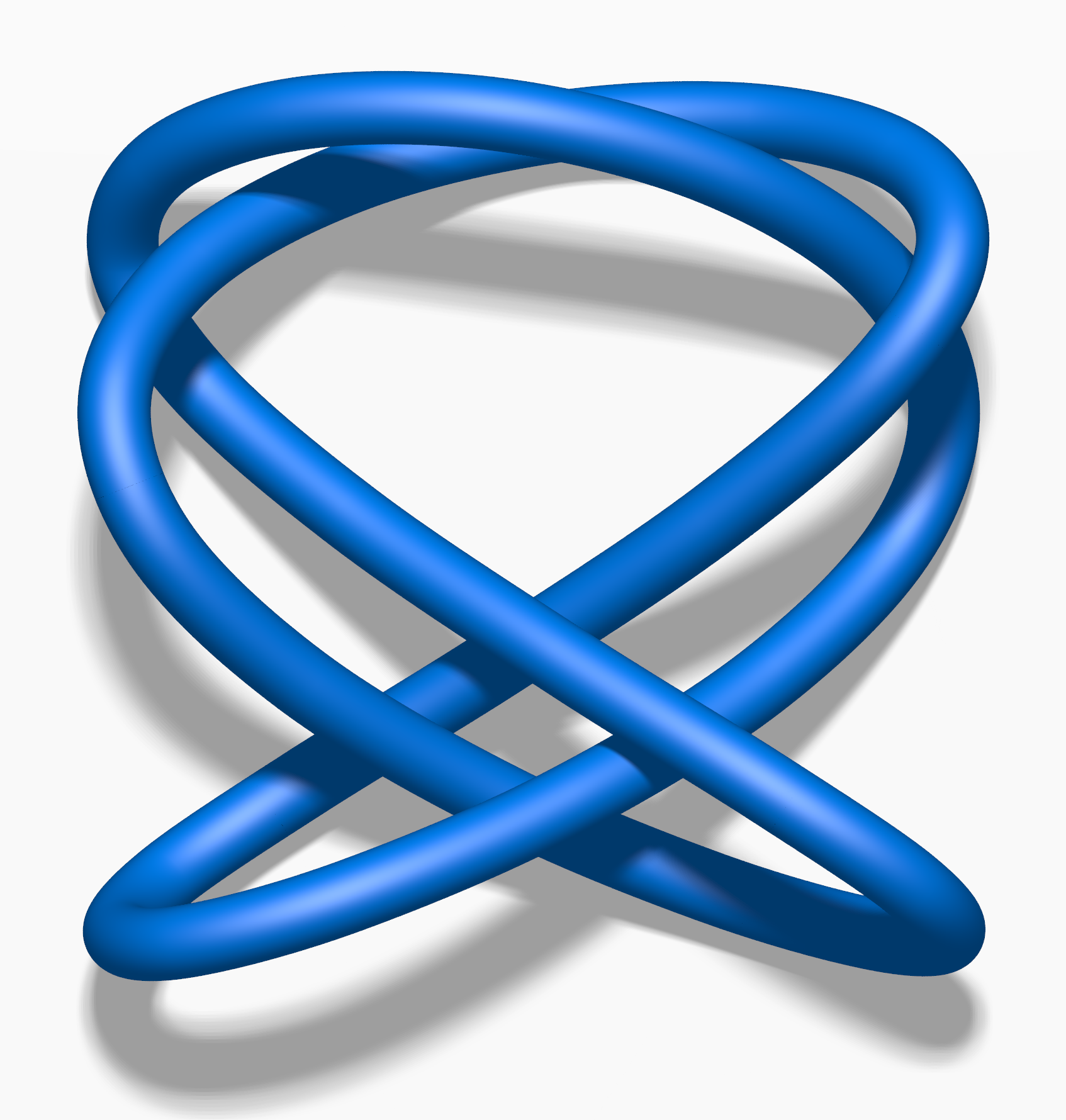
Stevedore knot
$(n_x,n_y,n_z)=(3,2,5)$
$(\phi_x,\phi_y)=(1.5,0.2)$

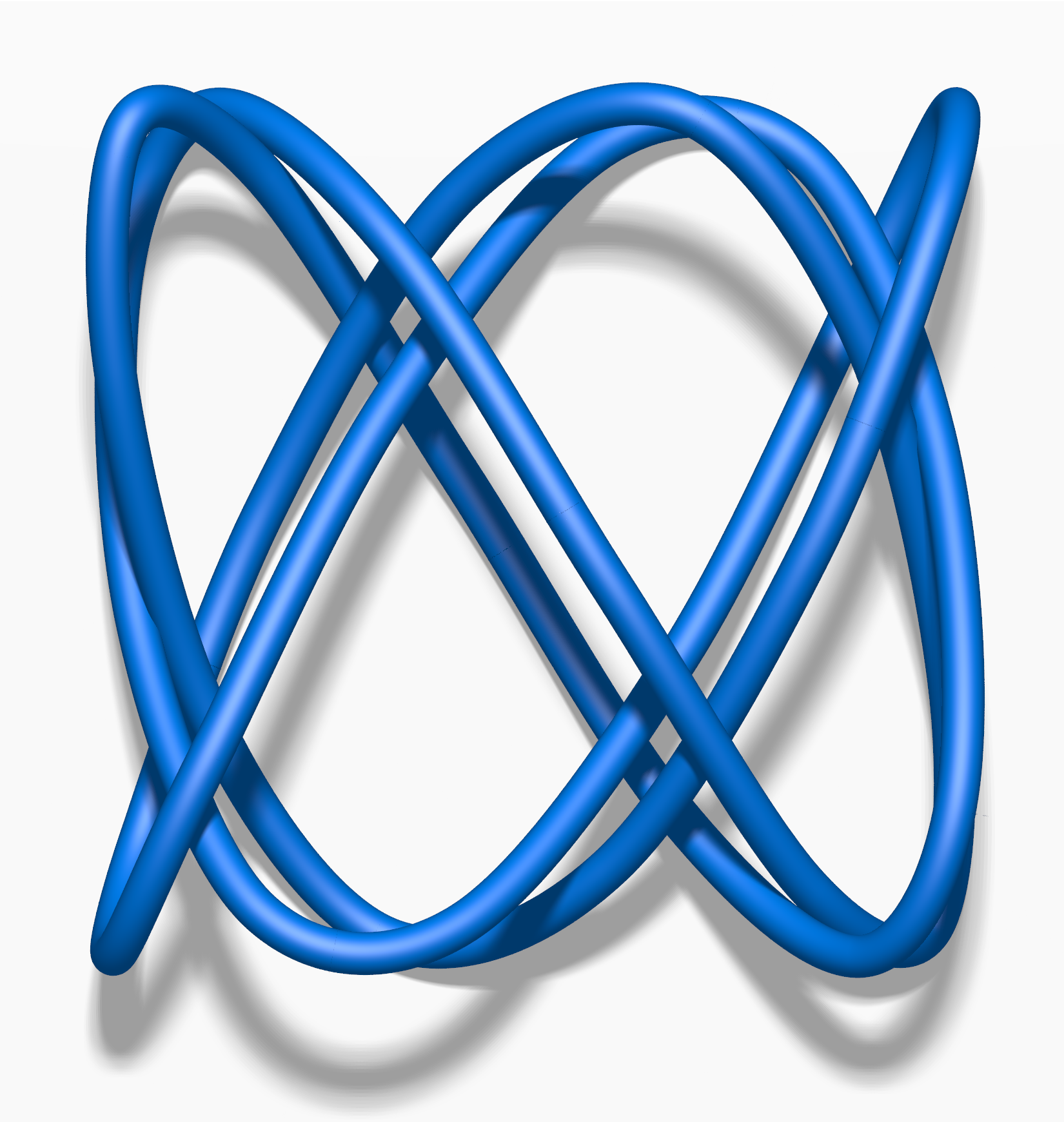
Square knot
$(n_x,n_y,n_z)=(3,5,7)$
$(\phi_x,\phi_y)=(0.7,1.0)$

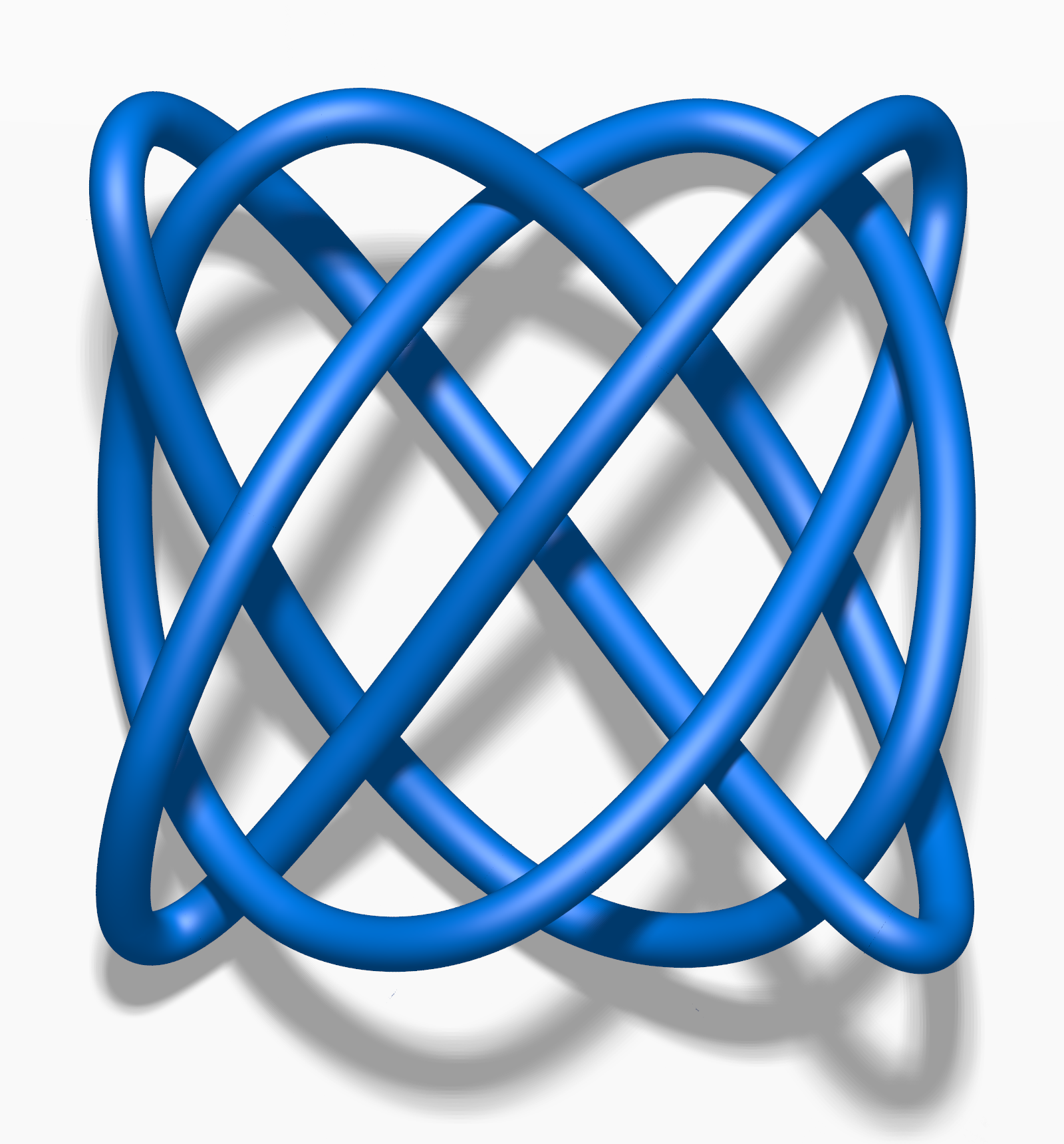
8_{21} knot
$(n_x,n_y,n_z)=(3,4,7)$
$(\phi_x,\phi_y)=(0.1,0.7)$

There are infinitely many different Lissajous knots, and other examples with 10 or fewer crossings include the 7_{4} knot, the 8_{15} knot, the 10_{1} knot, the 10_{35} knot, the 10_{58} knot, and the composite knot 5_{2}^{*} # 5_{2}, as well as the 9_{16} knot, 10_{76} knot, the 10_{99} knot, the 10_{122} knot, the 10_{144} knot, the granny knot, and the composite knot 5_{2} # 5_{2}. In addition, it is known that every twist knot with Arf invariant zero is a Lissajous knot.

== Symmetry ==
Lissajous knots are highly symmetric, though the type of symmetry depends on whether or not the numbers $n_x$, $n_y$, and $n_z$ are all odd.

=== Odd case ===
If $n_x$, $n_y$, and $n_z$ are all odd, then the point reflection across the origin $(x,y,z)\mapsto (-x,-y,-z)$ is a symmetry of the Lissajous knot which preserves the knot orientation.

In general, a knot that has an orientation-preserving point reflection symmetry is known as strongly positive amphicheiral. This is a fairly rare property: only seven prime knots with twelve or fewer crossings are strongly positive amphicheiral (10_{99}, 10_{123}, 12a427, 12a1019, 12a1105, 12a1202, 12n706). Since this is so rare, ′most′ prime Lissajous knots lie in the even case.

=== Even case ===
If one of the frequencies (say $n_x$) is even, then the 180° rotation around the x-axis $(x,y,z)\mapsto (x,-y,-z)$ is a symmetry of the Lissajous knot. In general, a knot that has a symmetry of this type is called 2-periodic, so every even Lissajous knot must be 2-periodic.

=== Consequences ===
A Lissajous knot with three factors: $(n_x,n_y,n_z)=(4,5,41)$, $(\phi_x,\phi_y)=(0.01,0.16)$

The symmetry of a Lissajous knot puts severe constraints on the Alexander polynomial. In the odd case, the Alexander polynomial of the Lissajous knot must be a perfect square. In the even case, the Alexander polynomial must be a perfect square modulo 2. In addition, the Arf invariant of a Lissajous knot must be zero. It follows that:

- The trefoil knot and figure-eight knot are not Lissajous.
- No torus knot can be Lissajous.
- No fibered 2-bridge knot can be Lissajous.
