= 3-coloring =

3-coloring may refer to:

- Fox n-coloring, in knot theory, a method of colouring knots or links
  - Tricolorability, in knot theory, the property of being represented by three colours
- Graph coloring, in graph theory, the colouring of the vertices of a graph
