= Lissajous-toric knot =

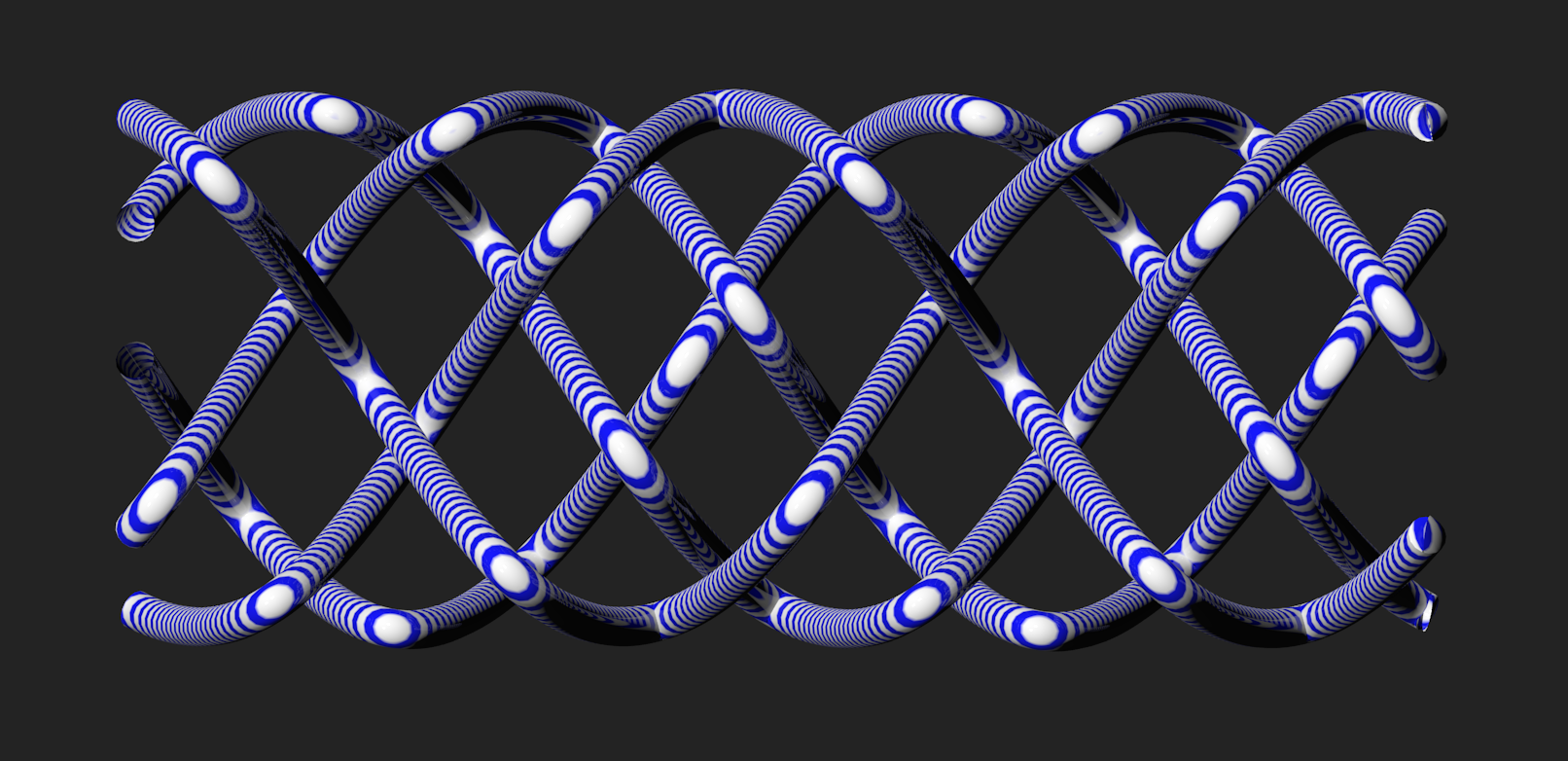
Lissajous-toric knot with parameters 5, 6 and 22 in braid form (with z-axis in horizontal direction)

In knot theory, a Lissajous-toric knot is a knot defined by parametric equations of the form:

$x(t)=(2+\sin qt)\cos Nt, \qquad y(t)=(2+\sin qt)\sin Nt, \qquad z(t)=\cos p(t+\phi),$

where $N$, $p$, and $q$ are integers, the phase shift $\phi$ is a real number and the parameter $t$ varies between 0 and $2\pi$.

For $p=q$ the knot is a torus knot.

== Braid and billiard knot definitions ==
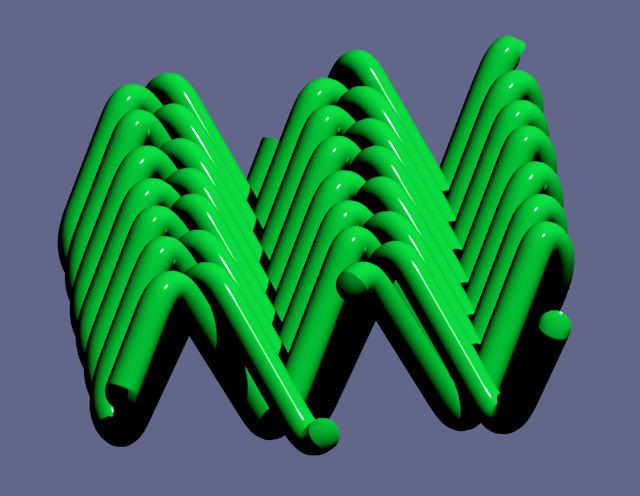
Lissajous-toric knot T(4,7,35) as a billiard knot, showing period 7

In braid form these knots can be defined in a square solid torus (i.e. the cube $[-1,1]^3$ with identified top and bottom) as

$$x(t)=\sin 2\pi qt, \qquad y(t)=\cos 2\pi p(t+\phi), \qquad z(t)=2(N t - \lfloor N t\rfloor )-1, \qquad t \in [0,1]$$.

The projection of this Lissajous-toric knot onto the x-y-plane is a Lissajous curve.

Replacing the sine and cosine functions in the parametrization by a triangle wave transforms a Lissajous-toric knot isotopically into a billiard curve inside the solid torus. Because of this property Lissajous-toric knots are also called billiard knots in a solid torus.

Lissajous-toric knots were first studied as billiard knots and they share many properties with billiard knots in a cylinder. They also occur in the analysis of singularities of minimal surfaces with branch points and in the study of the Three-body problem.

The knots in the subfamily with $p = q \cdot l$, with an integer $l \ge 1$, are known as ′Lemniscate knots′. Lemniscate knots have period $q$ and are fibred. The knot shown on the right is of this type (with $l=5$).

== Properties ==
Symmetries of the Lissajous-toric knot T(3,8,7): symmetric union (vertical axis), rotation into mirror image and palindromic property within Q (horizontal axis)

Lissajous-toric knots are denoted by $K(N,q,p,\phi)$. To ensure that the knot is traversed only once in the parametrization the conditions $\gcd(N,q)=\gcd(N,p)=1$ are needed. In addition, singular values for the phase, leading to self-intersections, have to be excluded.

The isotopy class of Lissajous-toric knots surprisingly does not depend on the phase $\phi$ (up to mirroring). If the distinction between a knot and its mirror image is not important, the notation $K(N,q,p)$ can be used.

The properties of Lissajous-toric knots depend on whether $p$ and $q$ are coprime or $d=\gcd(p,q)>1$. The main properties are:

- Interchanging $p$ and $q$:

$K(N,q,p)=K(N,p,q)$ (up to mirroring).

- Ribbon property:

If $p$ and $q$ are coprime, $K(N,q,p)$ is a symmetric union and therefore a ribbon knot.

- Periodicity:

If $d=\gcd(p,q)>1$, the Lissajous-toric knot has period $d$ and the factor knot is a ribbon knot.

- Strongly positive amphicheirality:

If $p$ and $q$ have different parity, then $K(N,q,p)$ is strongly positive amphicheiral.

- Period 2:

If $p$ and $q$ are both odd, then $K(N,q,p)$ has period 2 (for even $N$) or is freely 2-periodic (for odd $N$).

=== Example ===
The knot T(3,8,7), shown in the graphics, is a symmetric union and a ribbon knot (in fact, it is the composite knot $5_1 \sharp -5_1$). It is strongly positive amphicheiral: a rotation by $\pi$ maps the knot to its mirror image, keeping its orientation. An additional horizontal symmetry occurs as a combination of the vertical symmetry and the rotation (′double palindromicity′ in Kin/Nakamura/Ogawa).

== ′Classification′ of billiard rooms ==
In the following table a systematic overview of the possibilities to build billiard rooms from the interval and the circle (interval with identified boundaries) is given:

Billiard room	Billiard knots
$[-1,1]^3$	Lissajous knots
$[-1,1]^2 \times \mathbb{S}^1$	Lissajous-toric knots
$[-1,1] \times \mathbb{S}^1 \times \mathbb{S}^1$	Torus knots
$\mathbb{S}^1 \times \mathbb{S}^1 \times \mathbb{S}^1$	(room not embeddable into $\mathbb{R}^3$)

In the case of Lissajous knots reflections at the boundaries occur in all of the three cube's dimensions. In the second case reflections occur in two dimensions and we have a uniform movement in the third dimension. The third case is nearly equal to the usual movement on a torus, with an additional triangle wave movement in the first dimension.
