= Wirtinger's inequality =

Wirtinger's inequality is either of two inequalities named after Wilhelm Wirtinger:

- Wirtinger's inequality for functions
- Wirtinger inequality (2-forms)
