= Francisco Javier González-Acuña =

Francisco Javier González-Acuña (nickname "Fico") is a mathematician in the UNAM's institute of mathematics and CIMAT, specializing in low-dimensional topology.

== Education ==
He did his graduate studies at Princeton University, obtaining his Ph.D. in 1970. His thesis, written under the supervision of Ralph Fox, was titled On homology spheres.

== Research ==
An early result of González-Acuña is that a group G is the homomorphic image of some knot group if and only if G is finitely generated and has weight at most one. This result (a "remarkable theorem", as Lee Neuwirth called it in his review), was published in 1975 in Annals of Mathematics. In 1978, together with José María Montesinos, he answered a question posed by Fox, proving the existence of 2-knots whose groups have infinitely many ends.

With Hamish Short, González-Acuña proposed and worked on the cabling conjecture: the only knots in the 3-sphere which admit a reducible Dehn surgery, i.e. a surgery which results in a reducible 3-manifold, are the cable knots.

== See also ==
- CIMAT
- UNAM

== Selected publications ==
- González-Acuña, F. (1975). "Homomorphs of knot groups". Annals of Mathematics. Second series. 102 (2): 37–377. doi:10.2307/1971036. JSTOR 1971036. MR 0379671.
- González-Acuña, F.; Montesinos, José María (1978). "Ends of knot groups". Annals of Mathematics. Second series. 108 (1): 91–96. doi:10.2307/1970930. JSTOR 1970930. MR 0559794.
- González-Acuña, Francisco González; Short, Hamish (1986). "Knot surgery and primeness". Mathematical Proceedings of the Cambridge Philosophical Society. 99 (1): 89–102. doi:10.1017/S0305004100063969. MR 0809502.
- Gómez-Larrañaga, J. C.; González-Acuña, F.; Hoste, Jim (1991). "Minimal atlases on 3-manifolds". Mathematical Proceedings of the Cambridge Philosophical Society. 109: 105–115. doi:10.1017/S0305004100069590. MR 1075124.
