= Square knot =

A square knot is another name for a reef knot.

Square knot may also refer to:

- Square knot, a particular use of a reef knot formed over two other strands, used in macramé
- Square knot, another name for a cross knot in Chinese knotting
- Square knot (mathematics), a composite knot obtained by taking the connected sum of a trefoil knot with its reflection
- Square knot insignia, embroidered cloth patches that represent awards of the Boy Scouts of America and Scout associations throughout the world
