= Fox derivative =

Concept in mathematics

In mathematics, the Fox derivative is an algebraic construction in the theory of free groups which bears many similarities to the conventional derivative of calculus. The Fox derivative and related concepts are often referred to as the Fox calculus, or (Fox's original term) the free differential calculus. The Fox derivative was developed in a series of five papers by mathematician Ralph Fox, published in Annals of Mathematics beginning in 1953.

== Definition ==
If $G$ is a free group with identity element $e$ and generators $g_i$, then the Fox derivative with respect to $g_i$ is a function from $G$ into the integral group ring $\Z G$ which is denoted $\frac{\partial}{\partial g_i}$, and obeys the following axioms:

- $\frac{\partial}{\partial g_i}(g_j) = \delta_{ij}$, where $\delta_{ij}$ is the Kronecker delta
- $\frac{\partial}{\partial g_i}(e) = 0$
- $\frac{\partial}{\partial g_i}(uv) = \frac{\partial}{\partial g_i}(u) + u\frac{\partial}{\partial g_i}(v)$ for any elements $u$ and $v$ of $G$.

The first two axioms are identical to similar properties of the partial derivative of calculus, and the third is a modified version of the product rule. As a consequence of the axioms, we have the following formula for inverses

- $\frac{\partial}{\partial g_i}(u^{-1}) = -u^{-1}\frac{\partial}{\partial g_i}(u)$ for any element $u$ of $G$.

== Applications ==
The Fox derivative has applications in group cohomology, knot theory, and covering space theory, among other areas of mathematics.

== See also ==
- Alexander polynomial
- Free group
- Ring (mathematics)
- Integral domain
- Derivation (differential algebra)
