= Wilhelm Gross =

Austrian mathematician

Wilhelm Gross (24 March 1886, Molln – 22 October 1918, Vienna) was an Austrian mathematician, known for the Gross star theorem.

Wilhelm Gross graduated from the Gymnasium in Linz and then studied from 1905 to 1910 at the University of Vienna, where he received his Ph.D. (Promotion) on 20 May 1910 with Wilhelm Wirtinger as thesis advisor. In October 1910 Gross passed his teaching qualification examination in mathematics and physics. After a three-semester stay in Göttingen during the years 1910–1912, he became in 1912 an assistant and from 1913 a Privatdozent at the University of Vienna. In the year 1918 he was promoted there to professor extraordinarius. In the same year he was awarded the Richard Lieben Prize for his research on the calculus of variations, but he died of influenza in the 1918-1920 pandemic.

Gross did research on function theory, differential equations, measure theory, geometry and invariant theory. In function theory he is known for his investigations of singularities of meromorphic functions on Riemann surfaces, in particular, the Gross star theorem.

== Gross star theorem ==
- Hypothesis: Let f be a meromorphic function which is the ratio of two entire functions. Suppose that z is a complex number which is not a singular point of f. Define w = f(z). Consider the germ Φ_{z} of the inverse of f, such that Φ_{z}(w) = z.
- Conclusion: Then the set { e^{iθ} : 0 ≤ θ ≤ 2 π and Φ_{z} has an analytic continuation along the ray { w + r e^{iθ} : 0 ≤ r < ∞ } } is equal to the unit circle, except for a set with Lebesgue measure zero.

== Selected publications ==
- "Über Differentialgleichungssysteme erster Ordnung, deren Lösungen sich integrallos darstellen lassen." Mathematische Annalen 73, no. 1 (1912): 109–172. doi:10.1007/BF01456664
- "Das isoperimetrische Problem bei Doppelintegralen." Monatshefte für Mathematik und Physik 27, no. 1 (1916): 70–120. doi:10.1007/BF01726737
- "Bedingt konvergente Reihen." Monatshefte für Mathematik und Physik 28, no. 1 (1917): 221–237. doi:10.1007/BF01698244
- "Eine Bemerkung zum Cauchyschen Integral." Monatshefte für Mathematik 28, no. 1 (1917): 238–242. doi:10.1007/BF01698245
- "Zur Theorie der Differentialgleichungen mit festen kritischen Punkten." Mathematische Annalen 78, no. 1 (1917): 332–342. doi:10.1007/BF01457108
- "Zum Verhalten analytischer Funktionen in der Umgebung singulärer Stellen." Mathematische Zeitschrift 2, no. 3 (1918): 242–294. doi:10.1007/BF01199411
- "Eine ganze Funktion, für die jede komplexe Zahl Konvergenzwert ist." Mathematische Annalen 79, no. 1 (1918): 201–208. doi:10.1007/BF01457182
- "Über die Singularitäten analytischer Funktionen." Monatshefte für Mathematik 29, no. 1 (1918): 3–47. doi:10.1007/BF01700480
- "Über das lineare Maß von Punktmengen." Monatshefte für Mathematik und Physik 29, no. 1 (1918): 177–193. doi:10.1007/BF01700486

== Sources ==
- Wilhelm Blaschke: Nachruf auf Gross. Berichte über die Verhandlungen der Königlich Sächsischen Gesellschaft der Wissenschaften zu Leipzig, Mathematisch-Physische Classe, vol. 70 (1918), pp. 339–340.
- "Gross Wilhelm". In: Österreichisches Biographisches Lexikon 1815–1950 (ÖBL). Vol. 2, Austrian Academy of Sciences, Vienna 1959, p. 76.
- Wilhelm Gross at the Mathematics Genealogy Project
