= Symmetric union =

Class of symmetric knot diagrams in knot theory

The Kinoshita-Terasaka knot as a symmetric union

In knot theory, a symmetric union is a type of knot diagram which is invariant under reflection in a line, except at finitely many crossings or twist regions lying on the line of symmetry. A knot which admits such a diagram is said to have a symmetric union presentation.

The construction was introduced by Shin'ichi Kinoshita and Hidetaka Terasaka in 1957 and was generalized by Christoph Lamm to allow several twist regions on the symmetry axis. Every symmetric union represents a ribbon knot. For many years it was unknown whether the converse was true. In 2026, Michel Boileau, Teruaki Kitano and Yuta Nozaki exhibited a ribbon knot which does not admit any symmetric union presentation, showing that symmetric unions form a proper subclass of ribbon knots.

== Definition ==
Definition of a symmetric union diagram in knot theory: The two sides of the diagram are mirror images of each other. The 0-tangles on the axis are replaced by infinity tangles or twist tangles.

The convention for the two-string tangles on the axis

Definition of a symmetric union diagram for one component. This is the case $j=1$ in the general definition.

Let $D$ be a diagram of a knot $J$. Place $D$ and its reflected mirror image symmetrically with respect to an axis in the plane. Joining the two halves in the simplest way gives a diagram of the connected sum

$$J\#-J.$$

A symmetric union is obtained by replacing finitely many trivial tangles on the symmetry axis by integer twist tangles. The knot $J$ is called a partial knot of the presentation. The partial knot belongs to the presentation rather than to the resulting knot itself: the same knot can have different symmetric union presentations with different partial knots.

The original construction of Kinoshita and Terasaka used a single twist region. The term symmetric union in its present sense usually refers to the generalization with an arbitrary finite number of twist regions.

== Properties ==
A knot represented by a symmetric union diagram is a ribbon knot. The symmetry of the diagram gives an explicit immersed disk with only ribbon singularities.

Several classical invariants are strongly restricted by the partial knot. If $K$ is a symmetric union with partial knot $J$, then

$$\det(K)=\det(J)^2.$$

The Alexander polynomial depends only on the parities of the twist numbers. In particular, when all twist numbers are even,

$$\Delta_K(t)=\Delta_J(t)\Delta_J(t^{-1})$$

up to the usual normalization.

Symmetric union diagrams carry more information than the underlying knot. Eisermann and Lamm introduced symmetric Reidemeister moves and the resulting notion of symmetric equivalence. They also defined a two-variable refinement of the Jones polynomial which is invariant under these moves and can distinguish symmetric union presentations of the same knot. Other invariants of symmetric equivalence have subsequently been constructed, for example from spin models.

== Relation to ribbon knots ==
A symmetric union presentation for the knot $6_1$ and an illustration of the ribbon property.

Since every symmetric union is ribbon, a natural question raised in the modern study of the construction was whether every ribbon knot has a symmetric union presentation. Considerable evidence supported this possibility. In particular, all two-bridge ribbon knots are symmetric unions.

The conjectural converse was disproved in 2026. Boileau, Kitano and Nozaki showed that the Montesinos knot

$$K\left(\frac13,-\frac13,\frac13,-\frac13,\frac92\right)$$

is a ribbon knot but does not admit a symmetric union presentation. Their example is hyperbolic. The obstruction uses the fundamental groups of the two-fold branched covers: a symmetric union with partial knot $J$ gives rise to a degree-zero map

$$\Sigma_2(K)\longrightarrow\Sigma_2(J)$$

which is surjective on fundamental groups. For the Montesinos knot above, the possible target groups can be excluded.

Thus the class of symmetric unions is strictly smaller than the class of ribbon knots.

== Examples and partial knots ==
The knot $6_1$ is a simple symmetric union with the trefoil as a partial knot. The Kinoshita–Terasaka knot is a symmetric union with the unknot as partial knot.

The nonsymmetric composite ribbon knot $3_1 \# 8_{11}$ presented as a symmetric union

Partial knots need not be unique. Lamm and Tanaka studied this phenomenon systematically. They proved, among other results, that a partial knot of a two-bridge ribbon knot is itself a two-bridge knot, and consequently that a two-bridge ribbon knot has only finitely many possible partial knots. They also showed that the composite ribbon knot $3_1\#8_{11}$, which had been considered as a possible example outside the symmetric-union class, does have a symmetric union presentation, with $9_1$ as a partial knot.

More recently, twisted Alexander polynomials have provided further restrictions on possible partial knots. Boileau, Kitano and Nozaki derived relations between the twisted Alexander polynomials and genera of a symmetric union and its partial knot, giving new obstructions to proposed presentations.

The complexity of symmetric union presentations can also be measured by their twisting number, the minimum number of twist regions needed in such a presentation. Brejevs and Feller showed that this number is bounded below by the doubly slice genus and constructed symmetric unions with arbitrarily large twisting number.

== Open problems ==
Although not every ribbon knot is a symmetric union, several basic questions remain open. These include finding effective criteria which determine whether a given ribbon knot admits a symmetric union presentation, and understanding which knots can occur as partial knots of a given symmetric union.

It is not known whether the set of partial knots of an arbitrary symmetric union is always finite; finiteness is known for two-bridge ribbon knots.

The 2026 counterexample has determinant $729$. Boileau, Kitano and Nozaki therefore asked whether every ribbon knot of determinant $1$ admits a symmetric union presentation.
