= Wilhelm Wirtinger =

Austrian mathematician (1865–1945)

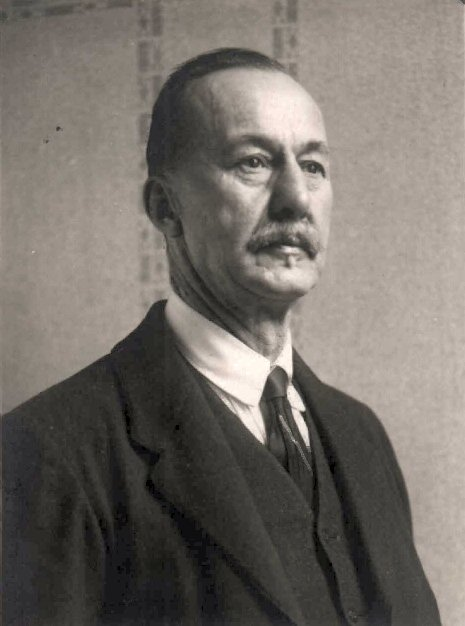
- Wilhelm Wirtinger
- Born: 19 July 1865; Ybbs an der Donau, Austrian Empire
- Died: 16 January 1945 (aged 79); Ybbs an der Donau, Greater German Reich
- Education: University of Vienna
- Known for: Complex analysis of one and several variables Wirtinger derivatives Wirtinger presentation Wirtinger's formula Wirtinger's inequality for functions Wirtinger's representation and projection theorem
- Awards: Sylvester Medal (1907)
- Scientific career
- Fields: Mathematics
- Workplaces: University of Innsbruck; University of Vienna
- Doctoral advisor: Emil Weyr; Gustav Ritter von Escherich
- Doctoral students: Wilhelm Blaschke; Hilda Geiringer; Gábor Szegő; Wilhelm Gross; Eduard Helly; Leopold Vietoris; Roland Weitzenböck

Wilhelm Wirtinger (19 July 1865 – 16 January 1945) was an Austrian mathematician, working in complex analysis, geometry, algebra, number theory, Lie groups, and knot theory.

== Biography ==
He was born at Ybbs an der Donau and studied at the University of Vienna, where he received his doctorate in 1887, and his habilitation in 1890. Wirtinger was greatly influenced by Felix Klein with whom he studied at the University of Berlin and the University of Göttingen.

=== Honours ===
In 1907 the Royal Society of London awarded him the Sylvester Medal, for his contributions to the general theory of functions.

== Work ==
=== Research activity ===
He worked in many areas of mathematics, publishing 71 works. His first significant work, published in 1896, was on theta functions. He proposed as a generalization of eigenvalues, the concept of the spectrum of an operator, in an 1897 paper; the concept was further extended by David Hilbert and now it forms the main object of investigation in the field of spectral theory. Wirtinger also contributed papers on complex analysis, geometry, algebra, number theory, and Lie groups. He collaborated with Kurt Reidemeister on knot theory, showing in 1905 how to compute the knot group. Also, he was one of the editors of the Analysis section of Klein's encyclopedia.

During a conversation, Wirtinger attracted the attention of Stanisław Zaremba to a particular boundary value problem, which later became known as the mixed boundary value problem.

=== Teaching activity ===
A partial list of his students includes the following scientists:

- Alfred Berger
- Wilhelm Blaschke
- Hilda Geiringer
- Kurt Gödel
- Wilhelm Gross
- Eduard Helly
- Hans Hornich
- Erwin Schrödinger
- Karl Strubecker
- Gábor Szegő
- Olga Taussky-Todd
- Leopold Vietoris
- Roland Weitzenböck

== Selected publications ==
- Wirtinger, Wilhelm (1927), "Zur formalen Theorie der Funktionen von mehr komplexen Veränderlichen" [On the formal theory of functions of several complex variables], Mathematische Annalen (in German), 97 (1): 357–375, doi:10.1007/BF01447872, JFM 52.0342.03, S2CID 121149132, available at DigiZeitschirften. In this important paper, Wirtinger introduces several important concepts in the theory of functions of several complex variables, namely Wirtinger derivatives and the tangential Cauchy–Riemann condition. The paper is deliberately written from a formal point of view, i.e. without giving a rigorous derivation of the properties deduced.
- Wirtinger, Wilhelm (1936), "Eine Determinantenidentität und ihre Anwendung auf analytische Gebilde in euklidischer und Hermitescher Maßbestimmung" [A determinant identity and its application to analytic forms in Euclidean and Hermitian distances], Monatshefte für Mathematik (in German), 44 (1): 343–365, doi:10.1007/BF01699328, JFM 62.0815.01, MR 1550581, S2CID 121050865, Zbl 0015.07602.
- Wirtinger, Wilhelm (1936), "Ein Integralsatz über analytische Gebilde im Gebiete von mehreren komplexen Veränderlichen" [An integral theorem on analytic forms on a domain of several complex variables], Monatshefte für Mathematik (in German), 45 (1): 418–431, doi:10.1007/BF01708005, JFM 63.0308.03, MR 1550660, S2CID 121259390, Zbl 0016.40802.

== See also ==
- Wirtinger inequality (2-forms)

== Biographical references ==
- Hornich, Hans (1948), "Wilhelm Wirtinger", Monatshefte für Mathematik (in German), 52 (1): 1–12, doi:10.1007/BF01320497, MR 0024394, S2CID 189765736, Zbl 0030.10102, available at DigiZeitschirften. An ample commemorative paper containing a list of Wirtinger's publications.
