= Laakso space =

Type of mathematical fractal space

In mathematical analysis and metric geometry, Laakso spaces are a class of metric spaces which are fractal, in the sense that they have non-integer Hausdorff dimension, but that admit a notion of differential calculus. They are constructed as quotient spaces of [0, 1] × K where K is a Cantor set.

== Background ==
Cheeger defined a notion of differentiability for real-valued functions on metric measure spaces which are doubling and satisfy a Poincaré inequality, generalizing the usual notion on Euclidean space and Riemannian manifolds. Spaces that satisfy these conditions include Carnot groups and other sub-Riemannian manifolds, but not classic fractals such as the Koch snowflake or the Sierpiński gasket. The question therefore arose whether spaces of fractional Hausdorff dimension can satisfy a Poincaré inequality. Bourdon and Pajot were the first to construct such spaces. Tomi J. Laakso gave a different construction which gave spaces with Hausdorff dimension any real number greater than 1. These examples are now known as Laakso spaces.

== Construction ==
We describe a space $F_Q$ with Hausdorff dimension $Q \in (1,2)$. (For integer dimensions, Euclidean spaces satisfy the desired condition, and for any Hausdorff dimension S + r in the interval (S, S + 1), where S is an integer, we can take the space $\mathbb{R}^{S-1} \times F_{r+1}$.) Let t ∈ (0, 1/2) be such that $Q=1+\frac{\ln 2}{\ln(1/t)}.$ Then define K to be the Cantor set obtained by cutting out the middle 1 - 2t portion of an interval and iterating that construction. In other words, K can be defined as the subset of [0, 1] containing 0 and 1 and satisfying $K=tK \cup (1-t+tK).$ The space $F_Q$ will be a quotient of I × K, where I is the unit interval and I × K is given the metric induced from ℝ^{2}.

To save on notation, we now assume that t = 1/3, so that K is the usual middle thirds Cantor set. The general construction is similar but more complicated. Recall that the middle thirds Cantor set consists of all points in [0, 1] whose ternary expansion consists of only 0's and 2's. Given a string a of 0's and 2's, let K_{a} be the subset of points of K consisting of points whose ternary expansion starts with a. For example, $K_{2022}=\frac{2}{3}+\frac{2}{27}+\frac{2}{81}+\frac{1}{81}K.$ Now let b = u/3^{k} be a fraction in lowest terms. For every string a of 0's and 2's of length k - 1, and for every point x ∈ K_{a0}, we identify (b, x) with the point (b, x + 2/3^{k}) ∈ {b} × K_{a2}.

We give the resulting quotient space the quotient metric: $d_{F_Q}(p,q) = \inf(d_{I \times K}(p,q_1)+d_{I \times K}(p_2,q_2)+\cdots+d_{I \times K}(p_{n-1},q_{n-1})+d_{I \times K}(p_n,q)),$ where each q_{i} is identified with p_{i+1} and the infimum is taken over all finite sequences of this form.

In the general case, the numbers b (called wormhole levels) and their orders k are defined in a more complicated way so as to obtain a space with the right Hausdorff dimension, but the basic idea is the same.

== Properties ==
- F_{Q} is a doubling space and satisfies a (1, 1)-Poincaré inequality.
- F_{Q} does not have a bilipschitz embedding into any Euclidean space.
