= Poincaré inequality =

Mathematical inequality in Sobolev space theory

In mathematics, the Poincaré inequality is a result in the theory of Sobolev spaces, named after the French mathematician Henri Poincaré. The inequality allows one to obtain bounds on a function using bounds on its derivatives and the geometry of its domain of definition. Such bounds are of great importance in the modern, direct methods of the calculus of variations. A very closely related result is Friedrichs' inequality.

== Statement ==
=== The classical Poincaré inequality ===
Let $p$, so that $1 \leq p < \infty$ and $\Omega$ a subset bounded at least in one direction. Then there exists a constant $C$, depending only on $\Omega$ and $p$, so that, for every function $u$ of the Sobolev space $W_0^{1,p}(\Omega)$ of zero-trace (a.k.a. zero on the boundary) functions,

$$\| u \|_{L^{p} (\Omega)} \leq C \| \nabla u \|_{L^{p} (\Omega)}.$$

=== Poincaré–Wirtinger inequality ===
Assume that $1 \leq p \leq \infty$ and that $\Omega$ is a bounded connected open subset of the $n$-dimensional Euclidean space $\mathbb{R}^{n}$ with a Lipschitz boundary (i.e., $\Omega$ is a Lipschitz domain). Then there exists a constant $C$, depending only on $\Omega$ and $p$, such that for every function $u$ in the Sobolev space $W^{1,p}(\Omega)$,
$$\| u - u_{\Omega} \|_{L^{p} (\Omega)} \leq C \| \nabla u \|_{L^{p} (\Omega)},$$
where
$$u_{\Omega} = \frac{1}{|\Omega|} \int_{\Omega} u(y) \, \mathrm{d} y$$
is the average value of $u$ over $\Omega$, with $|\Omega|$ standing for the Lebesgue measure of the domain $\Omega$. When $\Omega$ is a ball, the above inequality is called a $(p,p)$-Poincaré inequality; for more general domains $\Omega$, the above is more familiarly known as a Sobolev inequality.

The necessity to subtract the average value can be seen by considering constant functions for which the derivative is zero while, without subtracting the average, we can have the integral of the function as large as we wish. There are other conditions instead of subtracting the average that we can require in order to deal with this issue with constant functions, for example, requiring trace zero, or subtracting the average over some proper subset of the domain. The constant $C$ in the Poincaré inequality may be different from condition to condition. Also note that the issue is not just the constant functions, because it is the same as saying that adding a constant value to a function can increase its integral while the integral of its derivative remains the same. So, simply excluding the constant functions will not solve the issue.

=== Generalizations ===
In the context of metric measure spaces, the definition of a Poincaré inequality is slightly different. One definition is: a metric measure space supports a (q,p)-Poincare inequality for some $1\le q,p<\infty$ if there are constants $C$ and λ ≥ 1 so that for each ball B in the space,
$$\mu(B)^{-\frac{1}{q}} \left \|u-u_B \right \|_{L^q(B)}\le C \operatorname{rad}(B) \mu(B)^{-\frac{1}{p}} \| \nabla u\|_{L^p(\lambda B)}.$$
Here we have an enlarged ball in the right hand side. In the context of metric measure spaces, $\|\nabla u\|$ is the minimal p-weak upper gradient of u in the sense of Heinonen and Koskela.

Whether a space supports a Poincaré inequality has turned out to have deep connections to the geometry and analysis of the space. For example, Cheeger has shown that a doubling space satisfying a Poincaré inequality admits a notion of differentiation. Such spaces include sub-Riemannian manifolds and Laakso spaces.

There exist other generalizations of the Poincaré inequality to other Sobolev spaces. For example, consider the Sobolev space H^{1/2}(T^{2}), i.e. the space of functions u in the L^{2} space of the unit torus T^{2} with Fourier transform û satisfying
$$[u]_{H^{1/2} (\mathbf{T}^{2})}^2 = \sum_{k \in \mathbf{Z}^2} | k | \left | \hat{u} (k) \right |^2 < + \infty.$$
In this context, the Poincaré inequality says: there exists a constant $C$ such that, for every u ∈ H^{1/2}(T^{2}) with u identically zero on an open set E ⊆ T^{2},
$$\int_{\mathbf{T}^2} | u(x) |^2 \, \mathrm{d} x \leq C \left( 1 + \frac1{\operatorname{cap} (E \times \{ 0 \})} \right) [ u ]_{H^{1/2} (\mathbf{T}^2)}^2,$$
where cap(E × {0}) denotes the harmonic capacity of E × {0} when thought of as a subset of $\mathbb{R}^{3}$.

Yet another generalization involves weighted Poincaré inequalities where the Lebesgue measure is replaced by a weighted version.

== The Poincaré constant ==
The optimal constant $C$ in the Poincaré inequality is sometimes known as the Poincaré constant for the domain $\Omega$. Determining the Poincaré constant is, in general, a very hard task that depends upon the value of $p$ and the geometry of the domain $\Omega$. Certain special cases are tractable, however. For example, if $\Omega$ is a bounded, convex, Lipschitz domain with diameter $d$, then the Poincaré constant is at most $d/2$ for $p=1$, and $d/\pi$ for $p=2$, and this is the best possible estimate on the Poincaré constant in terms of the diameter alone. For smooth functions, this can be understood as an application of the isoperimetric inequality to the function's level sets. In one dimension, this is Wirtinger's inequality for functions.

However, in some special cases the constant $C$ can be determined concretely. For example, for $p=2$, it is well known that over the domain of unit isosceles right triangle, $C = 1/\pi$ ( $C < d/\pi$ where $d = \sqrt 2$ ).

Furthermore, for a smooth, bounded domain $\Omega$, since the Rayleigh quotient for the Laplace operator in the space $W^{1,2}_0(\Omega)$ is minimized by the eigenfunction corresponding to the minimal eigenvalue $\lambda_1$ of the (negative) Laplacian, it is a simple consequence that, for any $u\in W^{1,2}_0(\Omega)$,
$$\|u\|_{L^2}^2\leq \lambda_1^{-1} \left \|\nabla u\right \|_{L^2}^2$$
and furthermore, that the constant $\lambda_1$ is optimal.

== Poincaré inequality on metric-measure spaces ==
Since the 90s there have been several fruitful ways to make sense of Sobolev functions on general metric measure spaces (metric spaces equipped with a measure that is often compatible with the metric in certain senses). For example, the approach based on "upper gradients" leads to Newtonian-Sobolev space of functions. Thus, it makes sense to say that a space "supports a Poincare inequality".

It turns out that whether a space supports any Poincare inequality and if so, the critical exponent for which it does, is tied closely to the geometry of the space. For example, a space that supports a Poincare inequality must be path connected. Indeed, between any pair of points there must exist a rectifiable path with length comparable to the distance of the points. Much deeper connections have been found, e.g. through the notion of modulus of path families. A good and rather recent reference is the monograph "Sobolev Spaces on Metric Measure Spaces, an approach based on upper gradients" written by Heinonen et al.

== Sobolev–Slobodeckij spaces ==
Given $0 < s < 1$ and $p \in [1, \infty)$, the Sobolev–Slobodeckij space $W^{s,p}(\Omega)$ is defined as the set of all functions $u$ such that $u \in L^p(\Omega)$ and the seminorm $[u]_{s,p}$ is finite, where $[u]_{s,p}$ is defined by:

$$[u]_{s,p} = \left( \int_\Omega \int_\Omega \frac{|u(x) - u(y)|^p}{|x - y|^{n + sp}} \, dx \, dy \right)^{1/p}$$

The Poincaré inequality in this context can be generalized as follows:

$$\|u - u_\Omega\|_{L^p(\Omega)} \leq C [u]_{s,p}$$

where $u_\Omega$ is the average of $u$ over $\Omega$ and $C$ is a constant dependent on $s, p$, and $\Omega$. This inequality holds for every bounded $\Omega$.

=== Proof of the Poincaré inequality ===
The proof follows that of Irene Drelichman and Ricardo G. Durán. Let $f_\Omega = \frac{1}{|\Omega|} \int_\Omega f(x) \, dx$. By applying Jensen's inequality, we obtain:

$$\|f - f_\Omega\|^p_{L^p(\Omega)} = \left\| \frac{1}{|\Omega|} \int_\Omega (f(y) - f(x)) \, dx \right\|^p_{L^p} = \int_\Omega \left| \frac{1}{|\Omega|} \int_\Omega f(y) - f(x) \, dy \right|^p \, dx$$
$$\leq \frac{1}{|\Omega|} \int_\Omega \int_\Omega |f(y) - f(x)|^p \, dy \, dx$$

By exploiting the boundedness of $\Omega$ and further estimates:

$$\frac{1}{|\Omega|} \int_\Omega \int_\Omega |f(y) - f(x)|^p \, dy \, dx$$
$$\leq \frac{\text{diam}(\Omega)^{n+sp}}{|\Omega|} \int_\Omega \int_\Omega \frac{|f(y) - f(x)|^p}{|y - x|^{n+sp}} \, dy \, dx$$

It follows that the constant $C$ is given as $C = \frac{\text{diam}(\Omega)^{\frac{n}{p}+s}}{|\Omega|^{\frac{1}{p}}}$; however, the reference with Theorem 1 indicates that this is not the optimal constant.

=== Poincaré on balls ===
We can derive a growth constant for Balls in a manner similar to previous cases. The relationship is given by the following inequality:

$$\|u - u_\Omega\|_{L^p(B_R(y))} \leq C R^s [u]_{\dot{W}^{s,p}(B_R(x))}$$

The proof proceeds similarly to the classical one, by using the scaling $u_R(x) = u(Rx)$. Then, by using a form of chain rule for the fractional derivative, we get $R^s$ as a result.

== See also ==
- Friedrichs' inequality
- Korn's inequality
- Spectral gap
