= Friedrichs' inequality =

Inequality on Lp norm with weak derivatives

In mathematics, Friedrichs' inequality is a theorem of functional analysis, due to Kurt Friedrichs. It places a bound on the L^{p} norm of a function using L^{p} bounds on the weak derivatives of the function and the geometry of the domain, and can be used to show that certain norms on Sobolev spaces are equivalent. Friedrichs's inequality generalizes the Poincaré–Wirtinger inequality, which deals with the case k = 1.

== Statement of the inequality ==
Let $\Omega$ be a bounded subset of Euclidean space $\mathbb R^n$ with diameter $d$. Suppose that $u:\Omega\to\mathbb R$ lies in the Sobolev space $W_0^{k, p} (\Omega)$, i.e., $u\in W^{k,p}(\Omega)$ and the trace of $u$ on the boundary $\partial\Omega$ is zero. Then
$$\| u \|_{L^p (\Omega)} \leq d^k \left( \sum_{| \alpha | = k} \| \mathrm{D}^{\alpha} u \|_{L^p (\Omega)}^p \right)^{1/p}.$$

In the above

- $\| \cdot \|_{L^p (\Omega)}$ denotes the L^{p} norm;
- α = (α_{1}, ..., α_{n}) is a multi-index with norm |α| = α_{1} + ... + α_{n};
- D^{α}u is the mixed partial derivative
  $$\mathrm{D}^\alpha u = \frac{\partial^{| \alpha |} u}{\partial_{x_1}^{\alpha_1} \cdots \partial_{x_n}^{\alpha_n} }.$$

== See also ==
- Poincaré inequality
