= Wirtinger's inequality for functions =

Theorem in analysis

For other inequalities named after Wirtinger, see Wirtinger's inequality.

In the mathematical field of analysis, the Wirtinger inequality is an important inequality for functions of a single variable, named after Wilhelm Wirtinger. It was used by Adolf Hurwitz in 1901 to give a new proof of the isoperimetric inequality for curves in the plane. A variety of closely related results are today known as Wirtinger's inequality, all of which can be viewed as certain forms of the Poincaré inequality.

== Theorem ==
There are several inequivalent versions of the Wirtinger inequality:

- Let y be a continuous and differentiable function on the interval [0, L] with average value zero and with y(0) = y(L). Then

$$\int_0^L y(x)^2\,\mathrm{d}x\leq\frac{L^2}{4\pi^2}\int_0^L y'(x)^2\,\mathrm{d}x,$$

and equality holds if and only if y(x) = c sin (2π(x − α))/L for some numbers c and α.

- Let y be a continuous and differentiable function on the interval [0, L] with y(0) = y(L) = 0. Then

$$\int_0^L y(x)^2\,\mathrm{d}x\leq\frac{L^2}{\pi^2}\int_0^L y'(x)^2\,\mathrm{d}x,$$

and equality holds if and only if y(x) = c sin πx/L for some number c.

- Let y be a continuous and differentiable function on the interval [0, L] with average value zero. Then

$$\int_0^L y(x)^2\,\mathrm{d}x\leq \frac{L^2}{\pi^2}\int_0^L y'(x)^2\,\mathrm{d}x.$$

and equality holds if and only if y(x) = c cos πx/L for some number c.

Despite their differences, these are closely related to one another, as can be seen from the account given below in terms of spectral geometry. They can also all be regarded as special cases of various forms of the Poincaré inequality, with the optimal Poincaré constant identified explicitly. The middle version is also a special case of the Friedrichs inequality, again with the optimal constant identified.

=== Proofs ===
The three versions of the Wirtinger inequality can all be proved by various means. This is illustrated in the following by a different kind of proof for each of the three Wirtinger inequalities given above. In each case, by a linear change of variables in the integrals involved, there is no loss of generality in only proving the theorem for one particular choice of L.

==== Fourier series ====
Consider the first Wirtinger inequality given above. Take L to be 2π. Since Dirichlet's conditions are met, we can write

$$y(x)=\frac{1}{2}a_0+\sum_{n\ge 1}\left(a_n\frac{\sin nx}{\sqrt{\pi}}+b_n\frac{\cos nx}{\sqrt{\pi}}\right),$$

and the fact that the average value of y is zero means that a_{0} = 0. By Parseval's identity,

$$\int_0^{2\pi}y(x)^2\,\mathrm{d}x=\sum_{n=1}^\infty(a_n^2+b_n^2)$$

and

$$\int_0^{2\pi}y'(x)^2 \,\mathrm{d}x = \sum_{n=1}^\infty n^2(a_n^2+b_n^2)$$

and since the summands are all nonnegative, the Wirtinger inequality is proved. Furthermore, it is seen that equality holds if and only if a_{n} = b_{n} = 0 for all n ≥ 2, which is to say that y(x) = a_{1} sin x + b_{1} cos x. This is equivalent to the stated condition by use of the trigonometric addition formulas.

==== Integration by parts ====
Consider the second Wirtinger inequality given above. Take L to be π. Any differentiable function y(x) satisfies the identity

$$y(x)^2+\big(y'(x)-y(x)\cot x\big)^2=y'(x)^2-\frac{d}{dx}\big(y(x)^2\cot x\big).$$

Integration using the fundamental theorem of calculus and the boundary conditions y(0) = y(π) = 0 then shows

$$\int_0^\pi y(x)^2\,\mathrm{d}x+\int_0^\pi\big(y'(x)-y(x)\cot x\big)^2\,\mathrm{d}x=\int_0^\pi y'(x)^2\,\mathrm{d}x.$$

This proves the Wirtinger inequality, since the second integral is clearly nonnegative. Furthermore, equality in the Wirtinger inequality is seen to be equivalent to y′(x) = y(x) cot x, the general solution of which (as computed by separation of variables) is y(x) = c sin x for an arbitrary number c.

There is a subtlety in the above application of the fundamental theorem of calculus, since it is not the case that y(x)^{2} cot x extends continuously to x = 0 and x = π for every function y(x). This is resolved as follows. It follows from the Hölder inequality and y(0) = 0 that

$$|y(x)|=\left|\int_0^x y'(x)\,\mathrm{d}x\right|\leq\int_0^x |y'(x)|\cdot1\,\mathrm{d}x\leq\left(\int_0^x1^2\mathrm{d}x\right)^{1/2}\left(\int_0^x y'(x)^2\,\mathrm{d}x\right)^{1/2}=\sqrt{x}\left(\int_0^x y'(x)^2\,\mathrm{d}x\right)^{1/2},$$

which shows that as long as

$$\int_0^\pi y'(x)^2\,\mathrm{d}x$$

is finite, the limit of 1/x y(x)^{2} as x converges to zero is zero. Since cot x < 1/x for small positive values of x, it follows from the squeeze theorem that y(x)^{2} cot x converges to zero as x converges to zero. In exactly the same way, it can be proved that y(x)^{2} cot x converges to zero as x converges to π.

==== Functional analysis ====
Consider the third Wirtinger inequality given above. Take L to be 1. Given a continuous function f on [0, 1] of average value zero, let Tf denote the function u on [0, 1] which is of average value zero, and with u′′ + f = 0 and u′(0) = u′(1) = 0. From basic analysis of ordinary differential equations with constant coefficients, the eigenvalues of T are (kπ)^{−2} for nonzero integers k, the largest of which is then π^{−2}. Because T is a bounded and self-adjoint operator, it follows that

$$\int_0^1 Tf(x)^2\,\mathrm{d}x\leq\pi^{-2}\int_0^1 f(x)Tf(x)\,\mathrm{d}x=\frac{1}{\pi^2}\int_0^1 (Tf)'(x)^2\,\mathrm{d}x$$

for all f of average value zero, where the equality is due to integration by parts. Finally, for any continuously differentiable function y on [0, 1] of average value zero, let g_{n} be a sequence of compactly supported continuously differentiable functions on (0, 1) which converge in L^{2} to y′. Then define

$$y_n(x)=\int_0^x g_n(z)\,\mathrm{d}z-\int_0^1 \int_0^w g_n(z)\,\mathrm{d}z\,\mathrm{d}w.$$

Then each y_{n} has average value zero with y_{n}′(0) = y_{n}′(1) = 0, which in turn implies that −y_{n}′′ has average value zero. So application of the above inequality to f = −y_{n}′′ is legitimate and shows that

$$\int_0^1 y_n(x)^2\,\mathrm{d}x\leq\frac{1}{\pi^2}\int_0^1 y_n'(x)^2\,\mathrm{d}x.$$

It is possible to replace y_{n} by y, and thereby prove the Wirtinger inequality, as soon as it is verified that y_{n} converges in L^{2} to y. This is verified in a standard way, by writing

$$y(x)-y_n(x)=\int_0^x \big(y_n'(z)-g_n(z)\big)\,\mathrm{d}z-\int_0^1\int_0^w (y_n'(z)-g_n(z)\big)\,\mathrm{d}z\,\mathrm{d}w$$

and applying the Hölder or Jensen inequalities.

This proves the Wirtinger inequality. In the case that y(x) is a function for which equality in the Wirtinger inequality holds, then a standard argument in the calculus of variations says that y must be a weak solution of the Euler–Lagrange equation y′′(x) + y(x) = 0 with y′(0) = y′(1) = 0, and the regularity theory of such equations, followed by the usual analysis of ordinary differential equations with constant coefficients, shows that y(x) = c cos πx for some number c.

To make this argument fully formal and precise, it is necessary to be more careful about the function spaces in question.

== Spectral geometry ==
In the language of spectral geometry, the three versions of the Wirtinger inequality above can be rephrased as theorems about the first eigenvalue and corresponding eigenfunctions of the Laplace–Beltrami operator on various one-dimensional Riemannian manifolds:

- the first eigenvalue of the Laplace–Beltrami operator on the Riemannian circle of length L is 4π^{2}/L^{2}, and the corresponding eigenfunctions are the linear combinations of the two coordinate functions.
- the first Dirichlet eigenvalue of the Laplace–Beltrami operator on the interval [0, L] is π^{2}/L^{2} and the corresponding eigenfunctions are given by c sin πx/L for arbitrary nonzero numbers c.
- the first Neumann eigenvalue of the Laplace–Beltrami operator on the interval [0, L] is π^{2}/L^{2} and the corresponding eigenfunctions are given by c cos πx/L for arbitrary nonzero numbers c.

These can also be extended to statements about higher-dimensional spaces. For example, the Riemannian circle may be viewed as the one-dimensional version of either a sphere, real projective space, or torus (of arbitrary dimension). The Wirtinger inequality, in the first version given here, can then be seen as the n = 1 case of any of the following:

- the first eigenvalue of the Laplace–Beltrami operator on the unit-radius n-dimensional sphere is n, and the corresponding eigenfunctions are the linear combinations of the n + 1 coordinate functions.
- the first eigenvalue of the Laplace–Beltrami operator on the n-dimensional real projective space (with normalization given by the covering map from the unit-radius sphere) is 2n + 2, and the corresponding eigenfunctions are the restrictions of the homogeneous quadratic polynomials on R^{n + 1} to the unit sphere (and then to the real projective space).
- the first eigenvalue of the Laplace–Beltrami operator on the n-dimensional torus (given as the n-fold product of the circle of length 2π with itself) is 1, and the corresponding eigenfunctions are arbitrary linear combinations of n-fold products of the eigenfunctions on the circles.

The second and third versions of the Wirtinger inequality can be extended to statements about first Dirichlet and Neumann eigenvalues of the Laplace−Beltrami operator on metric balls in Euclidean space:

- the first Dirichlet eigenvalue of the Laplace−Beltrami operator on the unit ball in R^{n} is the square of the smallest positive zero of the Bessel function of the first kind J_{(n − 2)/2}.
- the first Neumann eigenvalue of the Laplace−Beltrami operator on the unit ball in R^{n} is the square of the smallest positive zero of the first derivative of the Bessel function of the first kind J_{n/2}.

== Application to the isoperimetric inequality ==
In the first form given above, the Wirtinger inequality can be used to prove the isoperimetric inequality for curves in the plane, as found by Adolf Hurwitz in 1901. Let (x, y) be a differentiable embedding of the circle in the plane. Parametrizing the circle by [0, 2π] so that (x, y) has constant speed, the length L of the curve is given by

$$\int_0^{2\pi}\sqrt{x'(t)^2+y'(t)^2}\,\mathrm{d}t$$

and the area A enclosed by the curve is given (due to Stokes theorem) by

$$-\int_0^{2\pi}y(t)x'(t)\,\mathrm{d}t.$$

Since the integrand of the integral defining L is assumed constant, there is

$$\frac{L^2}{2\pi}-2A=\int_0^{2\pi}\big(x'(t)^2+y'(t)^2+2y(t)x'(t)\big)\,\mathrm{d}t$$

which can be rewritten as

$$\int_0^{2\pi}\big(x'(t)+y(t)\big)^2\,\mathrm{d}t+\int_0^{2\pi}\big(y'(t)^2-y(t)^2\big)\,\mathrm{d}t.$$

The first integral is clearly nonnegative. Without changing the area or length of the curve, (x, y) can be replaced by (x, y + z) for some number z, so as to make y have average value zero. Then the Wirtinger inequality can be applied to see that the second integral is also nonnegative, and therefore

$$\frac{L^2}{4\pi}\geq A,$$

which is the isoperimetric inequality. Furthermore, equality in the isoperimetric inequality implies both equality in the Wirtinger inequality and also the equality x′(t) + y(t) = 0, which amounts to y(t) = c_{1} sin(t – α) and then x(t) = c_{1} cos(t – α) + c_{2} for arbitrary numbers c_{1} and c_{2}. These equations mean that the image of (x, y) is a round circle in the plane.
