= Ralph Fox =

American mathematician (1913–1973)

- Born: March 24, 1913; Morrisville, Pennsylvania, U.S.
- Died: December 23, 1973 (aged 60); Philadelphia, Pennsylvania, U.S.
- Education: Swarthmore College; Johns Hopkins University; Princeton University
- Known for: Compact-open topology; Fox derivative; Fox n-coloring; Fox–Artin arc
- Scientific career
- Fields: Mathematics
- Thesis: On the Lusternick–Schnirelmann Category (1939)
- Doctoral advisor: Solomon Lefschetz
- Doctoral students: Alan J. Goldman; Francisco Javier González-Acuña; Harold W. Kuhn; Samuel J. Lomonaco Jr.; Barry Mazur; John Milnor; John R. Stallings

Ralph Hartzler Fox (March 24, 1913 – December 23, 1973) was an American mathematician. As a professor at Princeton University, he taught and advised many of the contributors to the Golden Age of differential topology, and he played an important role in the modernization of knot theory and of bringing it into the mainstream.

== Biography ==
Ralph Fox attended Swarthmore College for two years, while studying piano at the Leefson Conservatory of Music in Philadelphia. He earned a master's degree from Johns Hopkins University, and a PhD degree from Princeton University in 1939. His doctoral dissertation, On the Lusternick–Schnirelmann Category, was directed by Solomon Lefschetz. (In later years he disclaimed all knowledge of the Lusternik–Schnirelmann category, and certainly never published on the subject again.) He directed 21 doctoral dissertations, including those of John Milnor, John Stallings, Francisco González-Acuña, Guillermo Torres-Diaz and Barry Mazur, and supervised Ken Perko's undergraduate thesis.

He was an Invited Speaker at the International Congress of Mathematicians held in 1950 in Cambridge, Massachusetts. His mathematical contributions include Fox n-coloring of knots, the Fox–Artin arc, and the free differential calculus. He also identified the compact-open topology on function spaces as being particularly appropriate for homotopy theory.

Aside from his strictly mathematical contributions, he was responsible for introducing several basic phrases to knot theory: the phrases slice knot, ribbon knot, and Seifert circle all appear in print for the first time under his name, and he also popularized (if he did not introduce) the phrase Seifert surface.

He popularized the playing of the game of Go at both Princeton and the Institute for Advanced Study.

== Selected publications ==
- Introduction to Knot Theory, Richard H. Crowell and Ralph H. Fox, Reprint of the 1963 original, Graduate Texts in Mathematics, No. 57, Springer-Verlag, New York-Heidelberg, 1977. ISBN 0-387-90272-4
- "A quick trip through knot theory", in: M. K. Fort (Ed.), Topology of 3-Manifolds and Related Topics, Prentice-Hall, New Jersey, 1961, pp. 120–167. MR 0140099
- Fox, Ralph H. (1970). "Metacyclic invariants of knots and links". Canadian Journal of Mathematics. 22 (2): 193–201. doi:10.4153/CJM-1970-025-9. MR 0261584. S2CID 121427629.
- Fox, Ralph H. (1966). "Rolling". Bulletin of the American Mathematical Society. 72, Part 1: 162–164. doi:10.1090/s0002-9904-1966-11467-2. MR 0184221.
- Fox, Ralph H.; Smythe, Neville F. (1964). "An ideal class invariant of knots". Bulletin of the American Mathematical Society. 15 (5): 707–709. doi:10.1090/s0002-9939-1964-0165516-2. MR 0165516.
- Chen, Kuo Tsai; Fox, Ralph H.; Lyndon, Roger C. (1958). "Free differential calculus. IV. The quotient groups of the lower central series". Annals of Mathematics. 68 (1): 81–95. doi:10.2307/1970044. JSTOR 1970044. MR 0102539.
- Fox, Ralph H. (1945). "On topologies for function spaces". Bulletin of the American Mathematical Society. 51 (6): 429–432. doi:10.1090/s0002-9904-1945-08370-0. MR 0012224.
- Blankinship, William A.; Fox, Ralph H. (1950). "Remarks on certain pathological open subsets of 3-space and their fundamental groups". Proceedings of the American Mathematical Society. 1 (5): 618–624. doi:10.1090/s0002-9939-1950-0042120-8. MR 0042120.
- Fox, Ralph H. (February 1945). "Torus Homotopy Groups". Proceedings of the National Academy of Sciences of the United States of America. 31 (2): 71–74. Bibcode:1945PNAS...31...71F. doi:10.1073/pnas.31.2.71. PMC 1078755. PMID 16588687.
- Fox, Ralph H. (1943). "On fibre spaces. I". Bulletin of the American Mathematical Society. 49 (8): 555–557. doi:10.1090/s0002-9904-1943-07969-4. MR 0008702.
- Fox, Ralph H. (1943). "On fibre spaces. II". Bulletin of the American Mathematical Society. 49 (10): 733–735. doi:10.1090/s0002-9904-1943-08015-9. MR 0009109.
- Fox, Ralph H. (1942). "A characterization of absolute neighborhood retracts". Bulletin of the American Mathematical Society. 48 (4): 271–275. doi:10.1090/s0002-9904-1942-07652-x. MR 0006508.
- Fox, Ralph H. (January 15, 1940). "On Homotopy and Extension of Mappings". Proceedings of the National Academy of Sciences of the United States of America. 26 (1): 26–28. Bibcode:1940PNAS...26...26F. doi:10.1073/pnas.26.1.26. PMC 1078000. PMID 16577957.
- Fox, Ralph; Neuwirth, Lee (1962). "The braid groups". Mathematica Scandinavica. 10: 119–126. doi:10.7146/math.scand.a-10518. MR 0150755.
