= Korn's inequality =

In mathematical analysis, Korn's inequality is an inequality concerning the gradient of a vector field that generalizes the following classical theorem: if the gradient of a vector field is skew-symmetric at every point, then the gradient must be equal to a constant skew-symmetric matrix. Korn's theorem is a quantitative version of this statement, which intuitively says that if the gradient of a vector field is on average not far from the space of skew-symmetric matrices, then the gradient must not be far from a particular skew-symmetric matrix. The statement that Korn's inequality generalizes thus arises as a special case of rigidity.

In (linear) elasticity theory, the symmetric part of the gradient is a measure of the strain that an elastic body experiences when it is deformed by a given vector-valued function. The inequality is therefore an important tool as an a priori estimate in linear elasticity theory.

== Statement of the inequality ==
Let $\Omega$ be an open, connected domain in n-dimensional Euclidean space $\mathbb{R}^n$, $n\ge 2$. Let $H^1(\Omega)$ be the Sobolev space of all vector fields $v=(v^1,\dots,v^n)$ on $\Omega$ that, together with their first weak derivatives, lie in the Lebesgue space $L^2(\Omega)$. Denoting the partial derivative with respect to the $i$-th coordinate by $\partial_i$, the norm in $H^1(\Omega)$ is given by

$\|v\|_{H^{1}(\Omega)} :=\left( \int_{\Omega}\sum_{i=1}^{n}|v^{i}(x)|^{2}\,\mathrm{d}x +\int_{\Omega}\sum_{i,j=1}^{n}|\partial_{j}v^{i}(x)|^{2}\,\mathrm{d}x \right)^{1/2}.$

Then there is a (minimal) constant $C\ge 0$, called the Korn constant of $\Omega$, such that for all $v\in H^{1}(\Omega)$ the following inequality holds:

| $\| v \|_{H^{1} (\Omega)}^{2} \leq C \int_{\Omega} \sum_{i, j = 1}^{n} \left( | v^{i} (x) |^{2} + | (e_{ij} v) (x) |^{2} \right) \, \mathrm{d} x$ | 1 |

where $e$ denotes the symmetrized gradient given by

$$e_{ij} v = \frac1{2} ( \partial_{i} v^{j} + \partial_{j} v^{i} ).$$

Inequality (1) is known as Korn's inequality.

== See also ==
- Hardy inequality
- Poincaré inequality
