= Centro de Investigación en Matemáticas =

Mexican research institute

Coordinates: 21°2′31.2″N 101°15′37.8″W

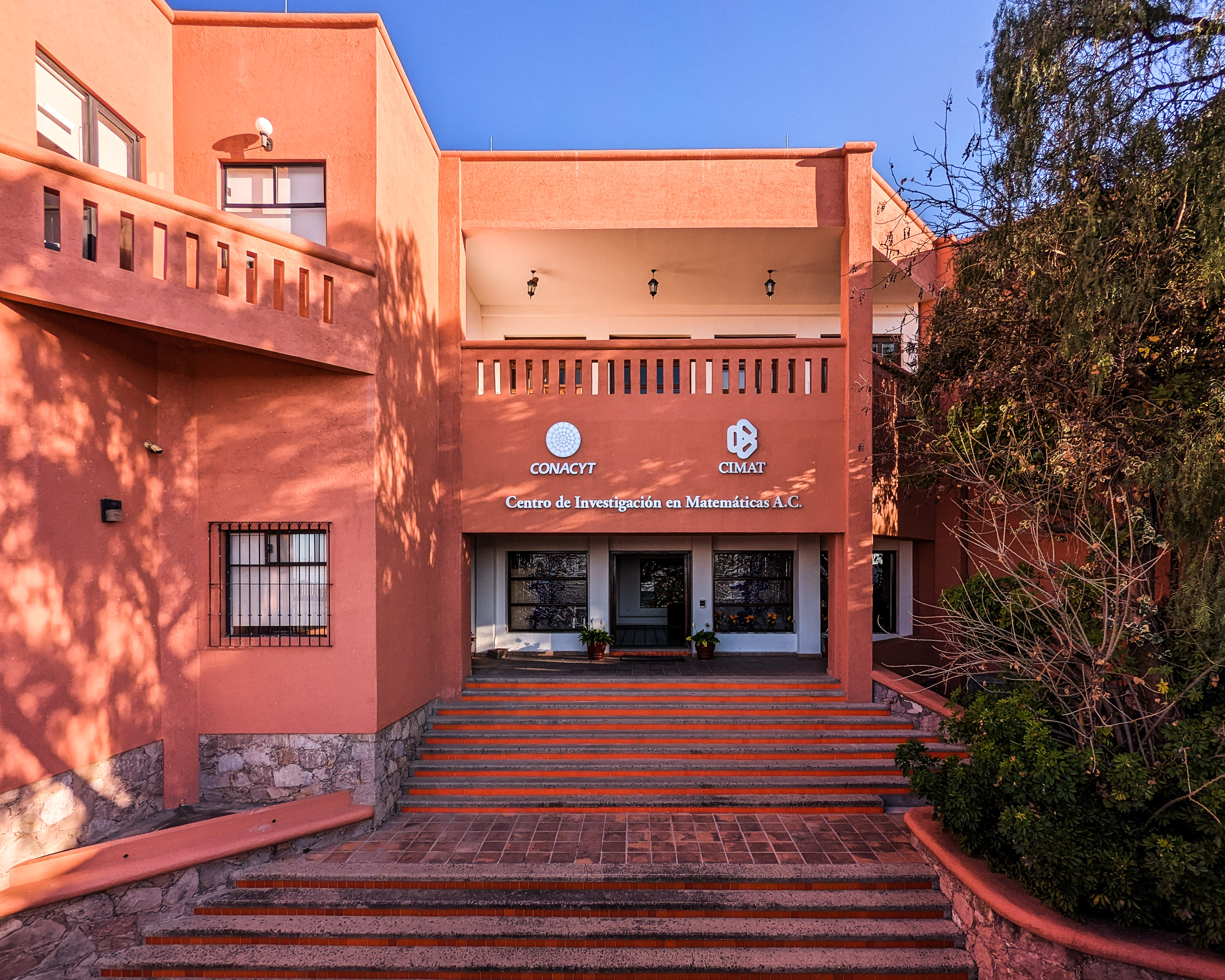
CIMAT front entrance

The Centro de Investigación en Matemáticas (CIMAT) is a Mexican mathematical research center. The name means "Center for Research in Mathematics" in Spanish. It is based in the city of Guanajuato, in the homonym State of Guanajuato, in central Mexico, and was established in the year 1980. It belongs to the Mexican National System of Public Centers of Research under administration of the country's National Council of Science and Technology (CONACyT).

CIMAT is oriented to scientific research under the auspices of the Mexican government. It is also devoted to the generation, dissemination and application of knowledge in specialized fields, as well as to the formation of human resources in the areas of pure and applied mathematics, probability and statistics, and computer science. Of CIMAT's faculty, more than 80% of the researchers belong to the Mexican National System of Researchers (SNI). Academically, the center is organized in four main areas: pure mathematics, applied mathematics, probability and statistics, and computer science.

The research groups of the center interact strongly with similar institutions in Mexico and in foreign countries. This provides a continuous flow of visitors from around the world and provides conferences, workshops, and seminars.

The educational programs at CIMAT currently have more than 200 students, who come from all over the country and from abroad (mainly from Central and South American countries, but also from African countries, the rest of North America, Spain and other countries). The Master's and Doctorate programs offered at the center are registered in the Excellency Graduate Studies Registry of the National Council of Science and Technology, CONACyT.

CIMAT's infrastructure includes offices, an auditorium, many seminar rooms, a specialized mathematical library, computing equipment, electronic communication devices, and a lodge known as CIMATEL, for the arrangement of national and international conferences, courses and academic reunions.

== Education ==
The center offers undergraduate and graduate programs that are attended by students from all over the country and abroad. The undergraduate programs are offered jointly with the University of Guanajuato, yet the teaching is in charge of the center's faculty. Many of the undergraduate students are former international/Iberoamerican mathematical Olympiad or informatics Olympiad contestants and medal winners.

CIMAT has an important role in the teaching of the mathematics and computer science undergraduate programs of the mathematics department of the University of Guanajuato.

Also, CIMAT offers a thesis-writing program, for students affiliated to other universities in the country.

Courses are usually offered in Spanish only.

== Departments ==
The center has three departments:

- Pure and Applied mathematics. Research groups are devoted to differential geometry, algebraic geometry, applied mathematics, dynamical systems, functional analysis, topology and combinatorial geometry.
- Probability and Statistics. Research groups are interested in probability and stochastic processes, environmental statistics, and industrial statistics.
- Computer science. Research lines include: image processing and computer vision, natural language processing, robotics, numerical methods, optimization, pattern recognition and data transmission.
- Unidad Aguascalientes. It is located in the city of Aguascalientes (near Guanajuato, approximately 2.5 hours away). Its purpose is to serve as a link with the Industrial Sector of Aguascalientes.
- Unidad Zacatecas. It is located in the city of Zacatecas. This center has personnel specialized in diverse areas of Software Engineering (such as software assurance, human-computer interaction, software and industrial processes improvement), and Robotics (automatic control, movement planning, automatic navigation, artificial intelligence, and human-robot interaction). CIMAT Zacatecas currently offers two postgraduate programs; a MSc program focused in Robotics and a Software Engineering Masters program.

== Consulting ==
CIMAT offers consulting for commercial firms and public agencies.

== See also ==
- Francisco Javier González-Acuña
