= Fox n-coloring =

In the mathematical field of knot theory, Fox n-coloring is a method of specifying a representation of a knot group or a group of a link (not to be confused with a link group) onto the dihedral group of order n where n is an odd integer by coloring arcs in a link diagram (the representation itself is also often called a Fox n-coloring). Ralph Fox discovered this method (and the special case of tricolorability) "in an effort to make the subject accessible to everyone" when he was explaining knot theory to undergraduate students at Haverford College in 1956. Fox n-coloring is an example of a conjugation quandle.

== Definition ==
Let L be a link, and let $\pi$ be the fundamental group of its complement. A representation $\rho$ of $\pi$ onto $D_{2n}$ the dihedral group of order 2n is called a Fox n-coloring (or simply an n-coloring) of L. A link L which admits such a representation is said to be n-colorable, and $\rho$ is called an n-coloring of L. Such representations of groups of links had been considered in the context of covering spaces since Reidemeister in 1929. [Actually, Reidemeister fully explained all this in 1926, on page 18 of "Knoten und Gruppen" in Hamburger Abhandlungen 5. The name "Fox coloring" was given to it much later by mathematicians who probably couldn't read German.] Fox's preferred term for so-called "Fox 3-coloring" was "property L"; see Exercise 6 on page 92 of his book "Introduction to Knot Theory" (1963).

The group of a link is generated by paths from a basepoint in $S^3$ to the boundary of a tubular neighbourhood of the link, around a meridian of the tubular neighbourhood, and back to the basepoint. By surjectivity of the representation these generators must map to reflections of a regular n-gon. Such reflections correspond to elements $ts^i$ of the dihedral group, where t is a reflection and s is a generating ($2\pi/n$) rotation of the n-gon. The generators of the group of a link given above are in bijective correspondence with arcs of a link diagram, and if a generator maps to $ts^i\in D_{2p}$ we color the corresponding arc $i\in \mathbb{Z}/p\mathbb{Z}$. This is called a Fox n-coloring of the link diagram, and it satisfies the following properties:

- At least two colors are used (by surjectivity of $\rho$).
- Around a crossing, the average of the colors of the undercrossing arcs equals the color of the overcrossing arc (because $\rho$ is a representation of the group of the link).

A n-colored link yields a 3-manifold M by taking the (irregular) dihedral covering of the 3-sphere branched over L with monodromy given by $\rho$. By a theorem of Montesinos and Hilden, any closed oriented 3-manifold may be obtained this way for some knot K and $\rho$ some tricoloring of K. This is no longer true when n is greater than three.

== Number of colorings ==
The number of distinct Fox n-colorings of a link L, denoted

$$\mathrm{col}_n(L),$$

is an invariant of the link, which is easy to calculate by hand on any link diagram by coloring arcs according to the coloring rules. When counting colorings, by convention we also consider the case where all arcs are given the same color, and call such a coloring trivial.

All possible tricolorings of the trefoil knot.

For example, the standard minimal crossing diagram of the Trefoil knot has 9 distinct tricolorings as seen in the figure:

- 3 "trivial" colorings (every arc blue, red, or green)
- 3 colorings with the ordering Blue→Green→Red
- 3 colorings with the ordering Blue→Red→Green

The set of Fox 'n'-colorings of a link forms an abelian group $C_n(K)\,$, where the sum of two n-colorings is the n-coloring obtained by strandwise addition. This group splits as a direct sum

$$C_n(K) \cong \mathbb Z_n \oplus C_n^0(K)\,$$,

where the first summand corresponds to the n trivial (constant) colors, and nonzero elements of $C_n^0(K)$ summand correspond to nontrivial n-colorings (modulo translations obtained by adding a constant to each strand).

If $\#$ is the connected sum operator and $L_1$ and $L_2$ are links, then

$$\mathrm{col}_n(L_1) \mathrm{col}_n(L_2) = n \mathrm{col}_n(L_1 \# L_2).$$

== Generalization to G-coloring ==
Let L be a link, and let π be the fundamental group of its complement, and let G be a group. A homomorphism $\rho$ of π to G is called a G-coloring of L. A G-coloring of a knot diagram is an induced assigning an element of G to the strands of L such that, at each crossing, if c is the element of G assigned to the overcrossing strand and if a and b are the elements of G assigned to the two undercrossing strands, then a = c^{−1} b c or b = c^{−1} a c, depending on the orientation of the overcrossing strand. If the group G is dihedral of order 2n, this diagrammatic representation of a G-coloring reduces to a Fox n-coloring. The torus knot T(3,5) has only constant n-colorings, but for the group G equal to the alternating group A_{5}, T(3,5) has non-constant G-colorings.
