= Wirtinger inequality (2-forms) =

For other inequalities named after Wirtinger, see Wirtinger's inequality.

In mathematics, the Wirtinger inequality, named after Wilhelm Wirtinger, is a fundamental result in complex linear algebra which relates the symplectic and volume forms of a hermitian inner product. It has important consequences in complex geometry, such as showing that the normalized exterior powers of the Kähler form of a Kähler manifold are calibrations.

== Statement ==
Consider a real vector space with positive-definite inner product g, symplectic form ω, and almost-complex structure J, linked by ω(u, v) = g(J(u), v) for any vectors u and v. Then for any orthonormal vectors v_{1}, ..., v_{2k} there is

$$(\underbrace{\omega\wedge\cdots\wedge\omega}_{k\text{ times}})(v_1,\ldots,v_{2k}) \leq k !.$$

There is equality if and only if the span of v_{1}, ..., v_{2k} is closed under the operation of J.

In the language of the comass of a form, the Wirtinger theorem (although without precision about when equality is achieved) can also be phrased as saying that the comass of the form ω ∧ ⋅⋅⋅ ∧ ω is equal to k!.

== Proof ==
=== k = 1 ===
In the special case k = 1, the Wirtinger inequality is a special case of the Cauchy–Schwarz inequality:

$$\omega(v_1,v_2)=g(J(v_1),v_2)\leq \|J(v_1)\|_g\|v_2\|_g=1.$$

According to the equality case of the Cauchy–Schwarz inequality, equality occurs if and only if J(v_{1}) and v_{2} are collinear, which is equivalent to the span of v_{1}, v_{2} being closed under J.

=== k > 1 ===
Let v_{1}, ..., v_{2k} be fixed, and let T denote their span. Then there is an orthonormal basis e_{1}, ..., e_{2k} of T with dual basis w_{1}, ..., w_{2k} such that

$$\iota^\ast\omega=\sum_{j=1}^k\omega(e_{2j-1},e_{2j})w_{2j-1}\wedge w_{2j},$$

where ι denotes the inclusion map from T into V. This implies

$$\underbrace{\iota^\ast\omega\wedge\cdots\wedge \iota^\ast\omega}_{k\text{ times}}=k!\prod_{i=1}^k\omega(e_{2i-1},e_{2i})w_1\wedge \cdots\wedge w_{2k},$$

which in turn implies

$$(\underbrace{\omega\wedge\cdots\wedge\omega}_{k\text{ times}})(e_1,\ldots,e_{2k})=k!\prod_{i=1}^k\omega(e_{2i-1},e_{2i})\leq k!,$$

where the inequality follows from the previously-established k = 1 case. If equality holds, then according to the k = 1 equality case, it must be the case that ω(e_{2i − 1}, e_{2i}) = ±1 for each i. This is equivalent to either ω(e_{2i − 1}, e_{2i}) = 1 or ω(e_{2i}, e_{2i − 1}) = 1, which in either case (from the k = 1 case) implies that the span of e_{2i − 1}, e_{2i} is closed under J, and hence that the span of e_{1}, ..., e_{2k} is closed under J.

Finally, the dependence of the quantity

$$(\underbrace{\omega\wedge\cdots\wedge\omega}_{k\text{ times}})(v_1,\ldots,v_{2k})$$

on v_{1}, ..., v_{2k} is only on the quantity v_{1} ∧ ⋅⋅⋅ ∧ v_{2k}, and from the orthonormality condition on v_{1}, ..., v_{2k}, this wedge product is well-determined up to a sign. This relates the above work with e_{1}, ..., e_{2k} to the desired statement in terms of v_{1}, ..., v_{2k}.

== Consequences ==
Given a complex manifold with hermitian metric, the Wirtinger theorem immediately implies that for any 2k-dimensional embedded submanifold M, there is

$$\operatorname{vol}(M)\geq\frac{1}{k!}\int_M \omega^k,$$

where ω is the Kähler form of the metric. Furthermore, equality is achieved if and only if M is a complex submanifold. In the special case that the hermitian metric satisfies the Kähler condition, this says that 1/k!ω^{k} is a calibration for the underlying Riemannian metric, and that the corresponding calibrated submanifolds are the complex submanifolds of complex dimension k. This says in particular that every complex submanifold of a Kähler manifold is a minimal submanifold, and is even volume-minimizing among all submanifolds in its homology class.

Using the Wirtinger inequality, these facts even extend to the more sophisticated context of currents in Kähler manifolds.

== See also ==
- Gromov's inequality for complex projective space
- Systolic geometry
