= Granny knot (mathematics) =

Connected sum of two trefoil knots with same chirality

- Common name: Granny knot
- Crossing no.: 6
- Stick no.: 8
- A–B notation: $3_1\#3_1$

Other
- alternating, composite, tricolorable

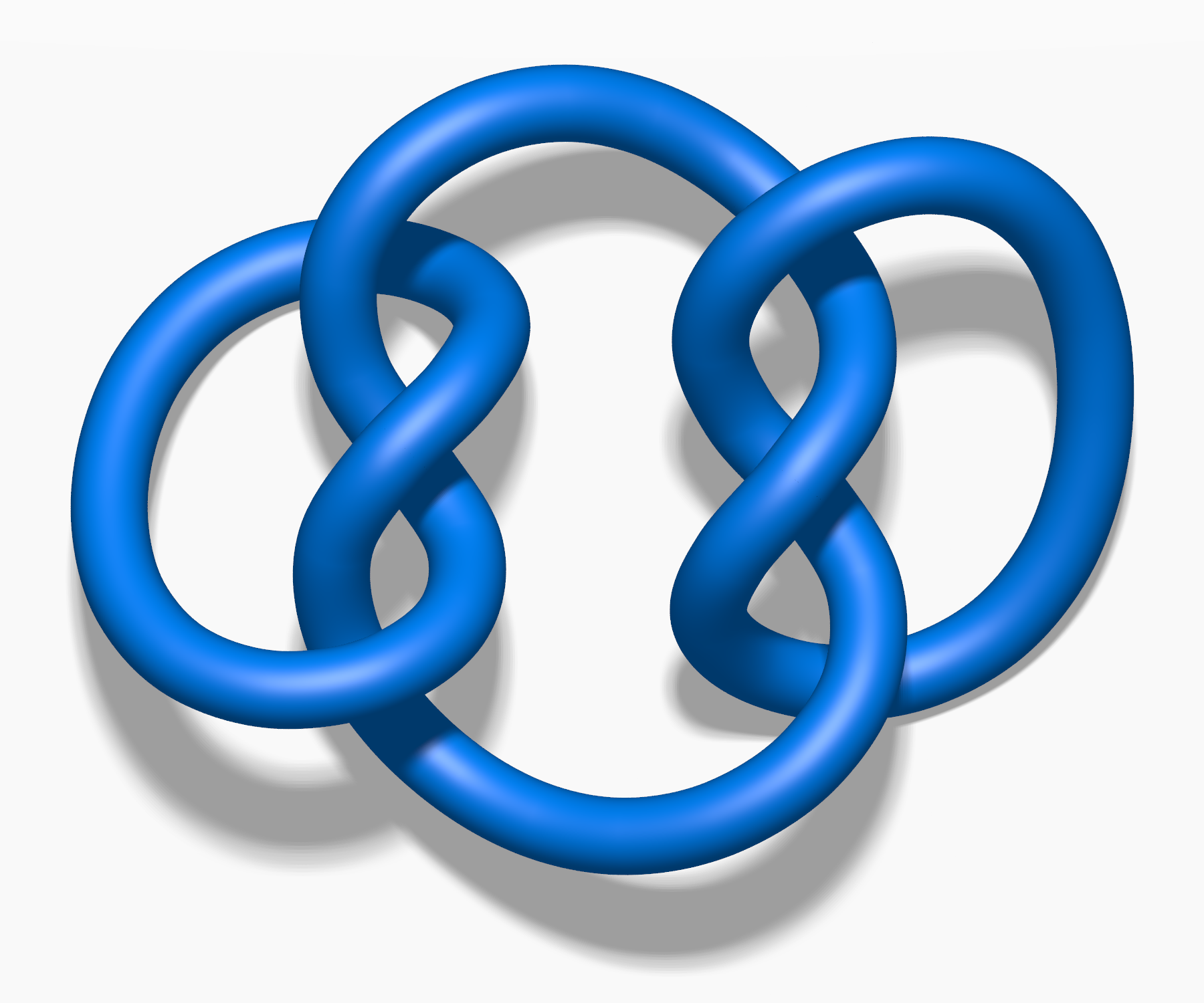
3D depiction

In knot theory, the granny knot is a composite knot obtained by taking the connected sum of two identical trefoil knots. It is closely related to the square knot, which can also be described as a connected sum of two trefoils. Because the trefoil knot is the simplest nontrivial knot, the granny knot and the square knot are the simplest of all composite knots.

The granny knot is the mathematical version of the common granny knot.

== Construction ==
The granny knot can be constructed from two identical trefoil knots, which must either be both left-handed or both right-handed. Each of the two knots is cut, and then the loose ends are joined together pairwise. The resulting connected sum is the granny knot.

It is important that the original trefoil knots be identical to each another. If mirror-image trefoil knots are used instead, the result is a square knot.

== Properties ==
The crossing number of a granny knot is six, which is the smallest possible crossing number for a composite knot. Unlike the square knot, the granny knot is not a ribbon knot or a slice knot.

The Alexander polynomial of the granny knot is

$$\Delta(t) = (t - 1 + t^{-1})^2,$$

which is simply the square of the Alexander polynomial of a trefoil knot. Similarly, the Conway polynomial of a granny knot is

$$\nabla(z) = (z^2+1)^2.$$

These two polynomials are the same as those for the square knot. However, the Jones polynomial for the (right-handed) granny knot is

$$V(q) = (q^{-1} + q^{-3} - q^{-4})^2 = q^{-2} + 2q^{-4} - 2q^{-5} + q^{-6} - 2q^{-7} + q^{-8}.$$

This is the square of the Jones polynomial for the right-handed trefoil knot, and is different from the Jones polynomial for a square knot.

The knot group of the granny knot is given by the presentation

$\langle x, y, z \mid x y x = y x y, x z x = z x z \rangle.$

This is isomorphic to the knot group of the square knot, and is the simplest example of two different knots with isomorphic knot groups.
