= Wirtinger presentation =

Group presentations useful in knot theory

In mathematics, especially in knot theory, a Wirtinger presentation is a finite presentation where the relations are of the form $wg_iw^{-1} = g_j$ where $w$ is a word in the generators, $\{g_1,g_2,\ldots,g_k\}.$ Wilhelm Wirtinger observed that the complements of knots in 3-space have fundamental groups with presentations of this form.

== Preliminaries and definition ==
A knot $K$ is an embedding of the circle $S^1$ in three-dimensional space $\mathbb R^3$. (Alternatively, the ambient space can also be taken to be the three-sphere $S^3$, which does not make a difference for the purposes of the Wirtinger presentation.) The open subspace which is the complement of the knot, $S^3 \setminus K$ is the knot complement. Its fundamental group $\pi_1(S^3 \setminus K)$ is an invariant of the knot in the sense that equivalent knots have isomorphic knot groups. It is therefore interesting to understand this group in an accessible way.

A Wirtinger presentation is derived from a regular projection of an oriented knot. Such a projection can be pictured as a finite number of (oriented) arcs in the plane, separated by the crossings of the projection. The fundamental group is generated by loops winding around each arc. Each crossing gives rise to a certain relation among the generators corresponding to the arcs meeting at the crossing.

== Wirtinger presentations of high-dimensional knots ==
More generally, co-dimension two knots in spheres are known to have Wirtinger presentations. Michel Kervaire proved that an abstract group is the fundamental group of a knot exterior (in a perhaps high-dimensional sphere) if and only if all the following conditions are satisfied:

1. The abelianization of the group is the integers.
2. The 2nd homology of the group is trivial.
3. The group is finitely presented.
4. The group is the normal closure of a single generator.

Conditions (3) and (4) are essentially the Wirtinger presentation condition, restated. Kervaire proved in dimensions 5 and larger that the above conditions are necessary and sufficient. Characterizing knot groups in dimension four is an open problem.

== Examples ==
For the trefoil knot, a Wirtinger presentation can be shown to be

$$\pi_1(\mathbb R^3 \backslash \text{trefoil}) = \lang x, y \mid (xy)^{-1}yxy = x \rang.$$

== See also ==
- Knot group
