= Square knot (mathematics) =

Connected sum of two trefoil knots with opposite chirality

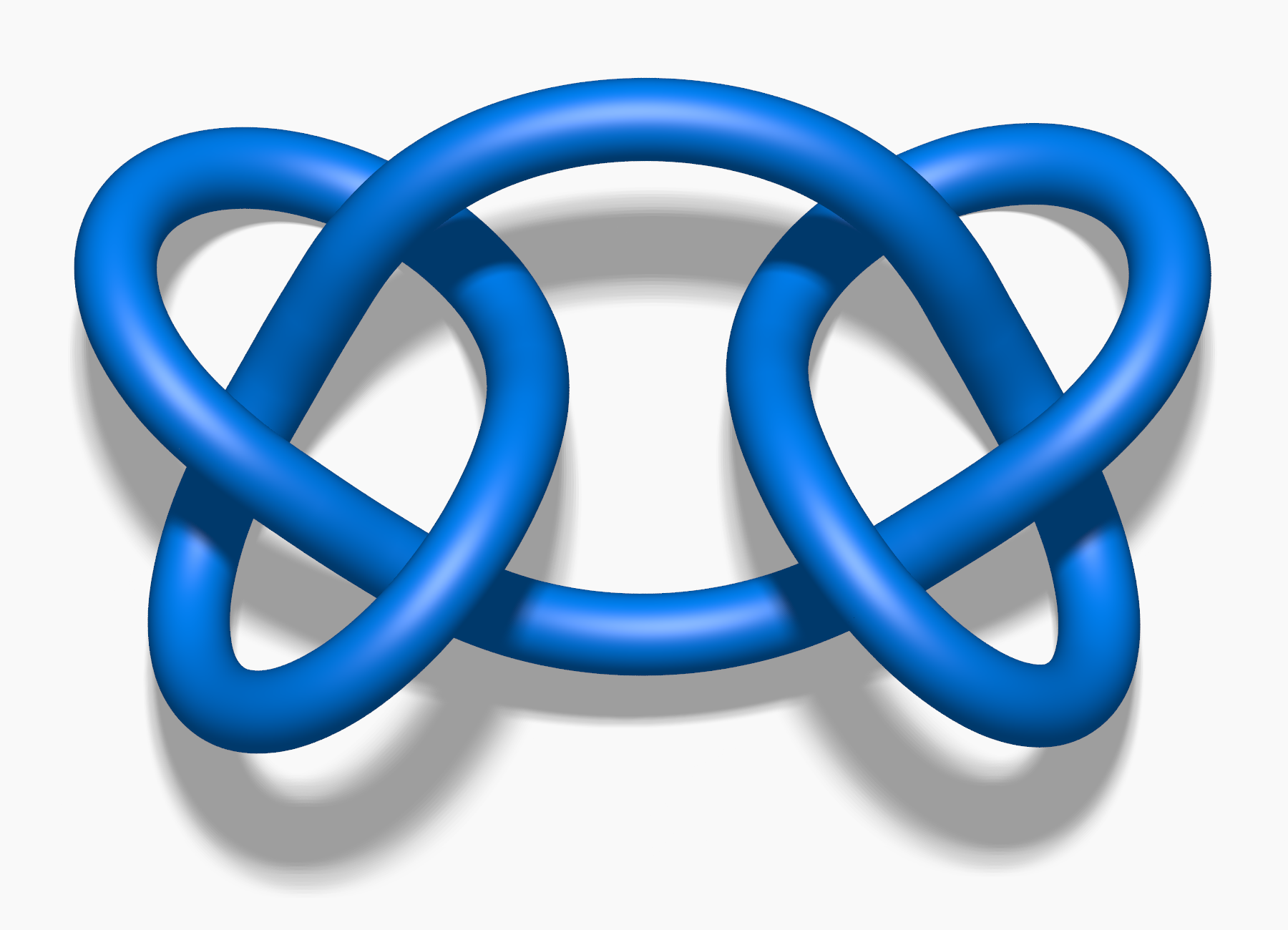
- Three-dimensional view
- Common name: Reef knot
- Crossing no.: 6
- Stick no.: 8
- A–B notation: $3_1\#3_1^*$

Other
- alternating, composite, pretzel, slice, amphichiral, tricolorable

The square knot, drawn as a ribbon knot

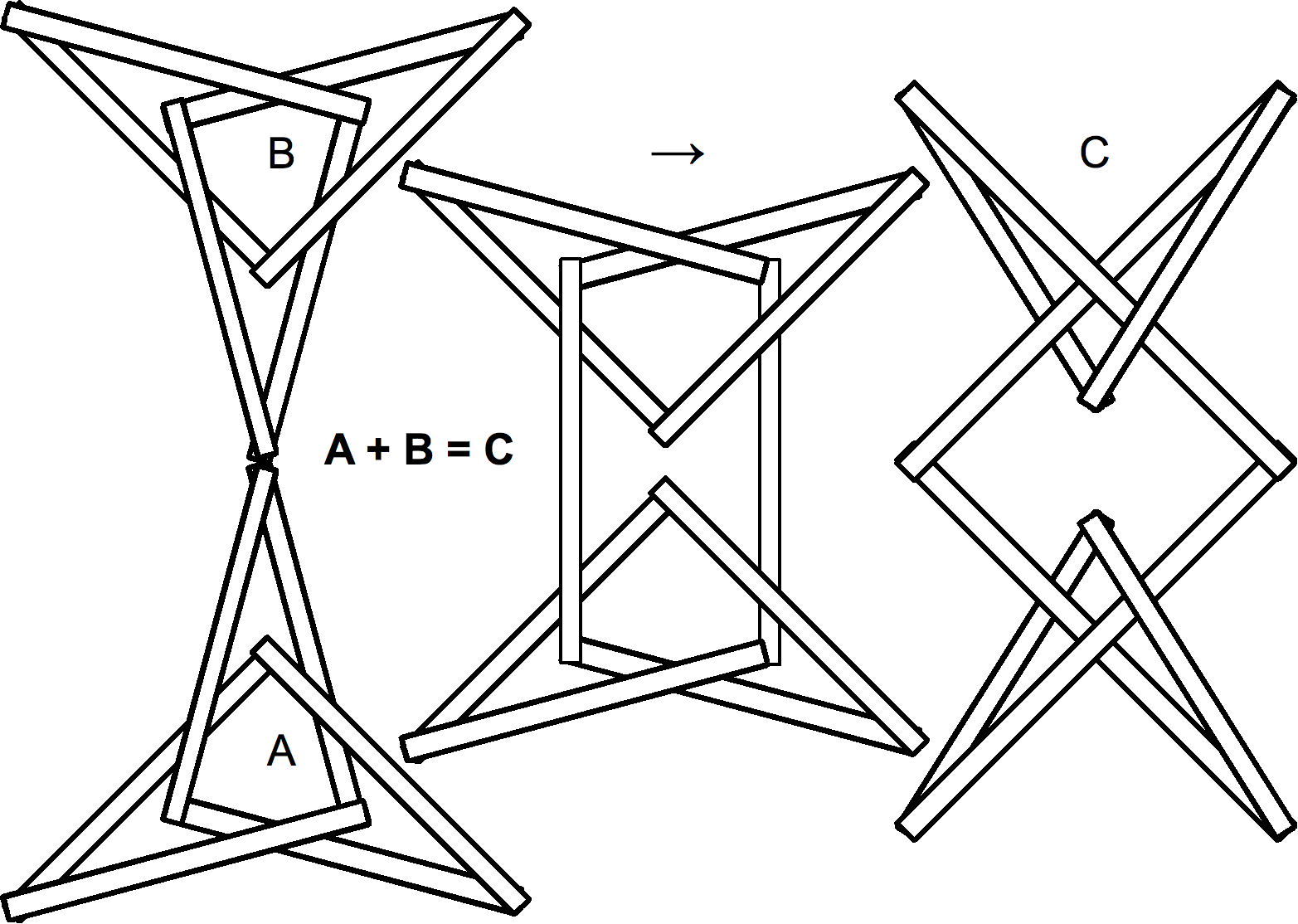
Square knot = trefoil + trefoil reflection. Sticks depicted.

In knot theory, the square knot is a composite knot obtained by taking the connected sum of a trefoil knot with its reflection. It is closely related to the granny knot, which is also a connected sum of two trefoils. Because the trefoil knot is the simplest nontrivial knot, the square knot and the granny knot are the simplest of all composite knots.

The square knot is the mathematical version of the common reef knot.

== Construction ==
The square knot can be constructed from two trefoil knots, one of which must be left-handed and the other right-handed. Each of the two knots is cut, and then the loose ends are joined together pairwise. The resulting connected sum is the square knot.

It is important that the original trefoil knots be mirror images of one another. If two identical trefoil knots are used instead, the result is a granny knot.

== Properties ==
The square knot is amphichiral, meaning that it is indistinguishable from its own mirror image. The crossing number of a square knot is six, which is the smallest possible crossing number for a composite knot.

The Alexander polynomial of the square knot is

$$\Delta(t) = (t - 1 + t^{-1})^2, \,$$

which is simply the square of the Alexander polynomial of a trefoil knot. Similarly, the Alexander–Conway polynomial of a square knot is

$$\nabla(z) = (z^2+1)^2.$$

These two polynomials are the same as those for the granny knot. However, the Jones polynomial for the square knot is

$$V(q) = (q^{-1} + q^{-3} - q^{-4})(q + q^3 - q^4) = -q^3 + q^2 - q + 3 - q^{-1} + q^{-2} - q^{-3}. \,$$

This is the product of the Jones polynomials for the right-handed and left-handed trefoil knots, and is different from the Jones polynomial for a granny knot.

The knot group of the square knot is given by the presentation

$\langle x, y, z \mid x y x = y x y, x z x = z x z \rangle. \,$

This is isomorphic to the knot group of the granny knot, and is the simplest example of two different knots with isomorphic knot groups.

Unlike the granny knot, the square knot is a ribbon knot, and it is therefore also a slice knot.
