= Tricolorability =

Property in knot theory

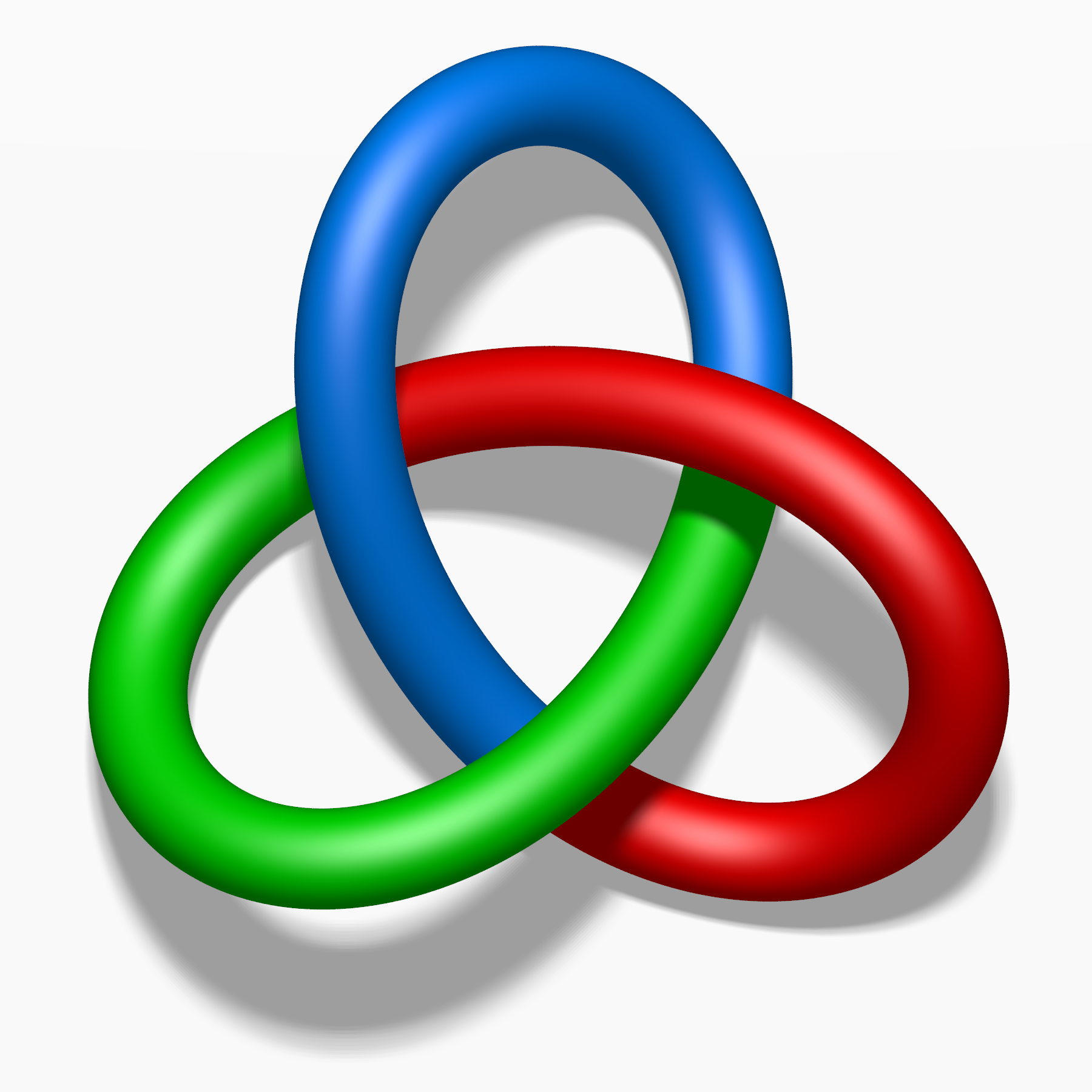
A tricolored trefoil knot.

In the mathematical field of knot theory, the tricolorability of a knot is the ability of a knot to be colored with three colors subject to certain rules. Tricolorability is an isotopy invariant, and hence can be used to distinguish between two different (non-isotopic) knots. In particular, since the unknot is not tricolorable, any tricolorable knot is necessarily nontrivial.

== Rules of tricolorability ==
In these rules a strand in a knot diagram will be a piece of the string that goes from one undercrossing to the next. A knot is tricolorable if each strand of the knot diagram can be colored one of three colors, subject to the following rules:

1. At least two colors must be used, and
2. At each crossing, the three incident strands are either all the same color or all different colors.

Some references state instead that all three colors must be used. For a knot, this is equivalent to the definition above; however, for a link it is not.

"The trefoil knot and trivial 2-link are tricolorable, but the unknot, Whitehead link, and figure-eight knot are not. If the projection of a knot is tricolorable, then Reidemeister moves on the knot preserve tricolorability, so either every projection of a knot is tricolorable or none is."

== Examples ==
Here is an example of how to color a knot in accordance of the rules of tricolorability. By convention, knot theorists use the colors red, green, and blue.

=== Example of a tricolorable knot ===

The granny knot is tricolorable. In this coloring the three strands at every crossing have three different colors. Coloring one but not both of the trefoil knots all red would also give an admissible coloring. The true lover's knot is also tricolorable.

Tricolorable knots with less than nine crossings include 6_{1}, 7_{4}, 7_{7}, 8_{5}, 8_{10}, 8_{11}, 8_{15}, 8_{18}, 8_{19}, 8_{20}, and 8_{21}.

=== Example of a non-tricolorable knot ===

The figure-eight knot is not tricolorable. In the diagram shown, it has four strands with each pair of strands meeting at some crossing. If three of the strands had the same color, then all strands would be forced to be the same color. Otherwise each of these four strands must have a distinct color. Since tricolorability is a knot invariant, none of its other diagrams can be tricolored either.

== Isotopy invariant ==
Tricolorability is an isotopy invariant, which is a property of a knot or link that remains constant regardless of any ambient isotopy. This can be proven for tame knots by examining Reidemeister moves. Since each Reidemeister move can be made without affecting tricolorability, tricolorability is an isotopy invariant of tame knots.

Reidemeister Move I is tricolorable.	Reidemeister Move II is tricolorable.	Reidemeister Move III is tricolorable.

== Properties ==
Because tricolorability is a binary classification (a link is either tricolorable or not*), it is a relatively weak invariant. The composition of a tricolorable knot with another knot is always tricolorable. A way to strengthen the invariant is to count the number of possible 3-colorings. In this case, the rule that at least two colors are used is relaxed and now every link has at least three 3-colorings (just color every arc the same color). In this case, a link is 3-colorable if it has more than three 3-colorings.

Any separable link with a tricolorable separable component is also tricolorable.

=== In torus knots ===
If the torus knot/link denoted by (m,n) is tricolorable, then so are (j*m,i*n) and (i*n,j*m) for any natural numbers i and j.

== See also ==
- Fox n-coloring
- Graph coloring
