= Ribbon knot =

Type of mathematical knot

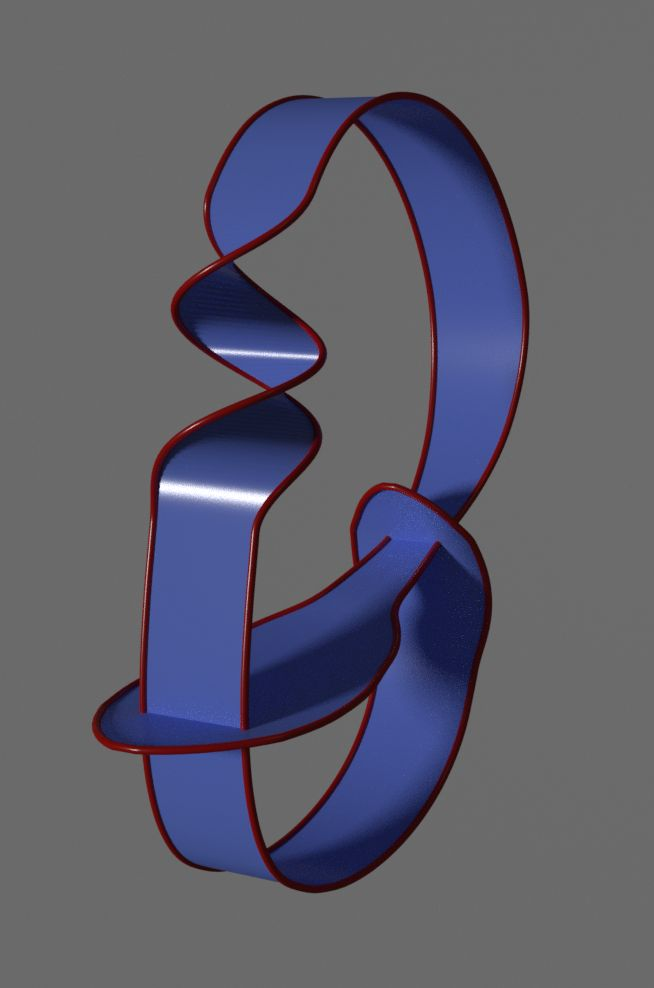
A 3-dimensional rendering of the ribbon knot $8_{20}$, showing the ribbon property

In the mathematical area of knot theory, a ribbon knot is a knot that bounds a self-intersecting disk with only ribbon singularities. Intuitively, this kind of singularity can be formed by cutting a slit in the disk and passing another part of the disk through the slit. More precisely, this type of singularity is a closed arc consisting of intersection points of the disk with itself, such that the preimage of this arc consists of two arcs in the disc, one completely in the interior of the disk and the other having its two endpoints on the disk boundary.

== Morse-theoretic formulation ==
A slice disc M is a smoothly embedded $D^2$ in $D^4$ with $M \cap \partial D^4 = \partial M \subset S^3$. Consider the function $f\colon D^4 \to \mathbb R$ given by $f(x,y,z,w) = x^2+y^2+z^2+w^2$. By a small isotopy of M one can ensure that f restricts to a Morse function on M. One says $\partial M \subset \partial D^4 = S^3$ is a ribbon knot if $f_{|M}\colon M \to \mathbb R$ has no interior local maxima.

== Slice-ribbon conjecture ==
Every ribbon knot is known to be a slice knot. A famous open problem, posed by Ralph Fox and known as the slice-ribbon conjecture, asks if the converse is true: is every (smoothly) slice knot ribbon?

Lisca (2007) showed that the conjecture is true for knots of bridge number two. Greene & Jabuka (2011) showed it to be true for three-stranded pretzel knots with odd parameters. However, Gompf, Scharlemann & Thompson (2010) suggested that the conjecture might not be true, and provided a family of knots that could be counterexamples to it. The conjecture was further strengthened when a famous potential counter-example, the (2, 1) cable of the figure-eight knot, was shown to be not slice and thereby not a counterexample.
