= Kinoshita–Terasaka knot =

Specific knot in knot theory with 11 crossings

- Crossing no.: 11
- Genus: 2
- Hyperbolic volume: 11.2191
- Thistlethwaite: 11n42

Other
- hyperbolic, prime, slice

The prime Kinoshita–Terasaka knot (11n42) (left) and the prime Conway knot (11n34) (right) showing how they are related by mutation

In knot theory, the Kinoshita–Terasaka knot is a particular prime knot with 11 crossings. It is named after Japanese mathematicians Shinichi Kinoshita and Hidetaka Terasaka, who wrote about it in 1957. The Kinoshita–Terasaka knot has a variety of interesting mathematical properties. It is related by mutation to the Conway knot, with which it shares a Jones polynomial. It has the same Alexander polynomial as the unknot.
