= Knot operation =

In knot theory, a knot move or operation is a change or changes which preserve crossing number. Operations are used to investigate whether knots are equivalent, prime or reduced.

Knot moves or operations include the flype, Habiro move, Markov moves (I. conjugation and II. stabilization), pass move, Perko move, and Reidemeister moves (I. twist move, II. poke move, and III. slide move).

== See also ==
- Knot sum
- Murasugi sum
- Mutation (knot theory)
