= Dreamhome =

Historic house in Maine, United States

- U.S. National Register of Historic Places
- U.S. Historic district
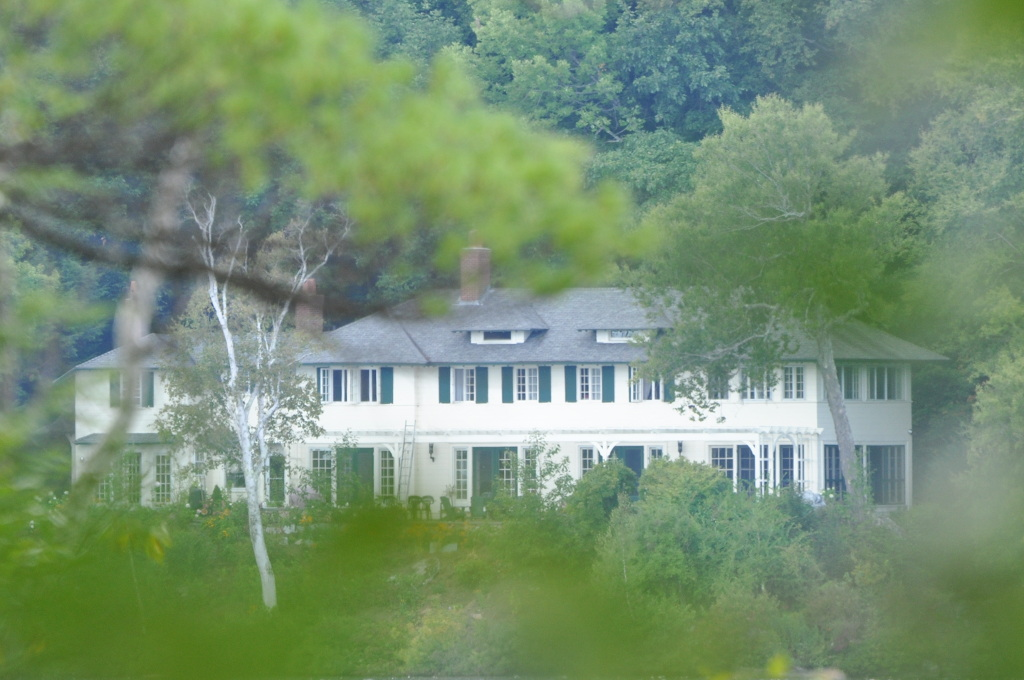

- Location within Maine Location within the United States
- Nearest city: Bryant Pond, Maine
- Area: 16 acres (6.5 ha)
- Built: 1916
- Landscape architect: Harold Hill Blossom
- Architectural style: Colonial Revival
- NRHP reference No.: 96001037
- Added to NRHP: September 27, 1996

Dreamhome is a historic summer estate near Bryant Pond, a village of Woodstock, Maine. It is located on 16 acres (6.5 ha) on the west side of Lake Christopher (a.k.a. Bryant Pond), at the end of Mountain Lodge Road, and includes an estate house, guest house, boathouse, and landscaped grounds designed by Harold Hill Blossom. The parcel is a remnant of a larger property owned by William and Bessie (Collier) Ellery, who had the house built c. 1916. The size and scale of this estate are unusual for the interior of Maine. The property was listed on the National Register of Historic Places in 1996.

== Description ==
The main house at Dreamhome is a two-story wood-frame structure, facing the lake to the east. It has a main block four bays wide, of which the middle two are slightly recessed, and there are projecting hip-roofed bays at the sides. All four first-floor bays have French doors, although the end bays originally had windows (leftmost bay) and an engaged porch (rightmost bay). The upper floor bays have a broad expanse of casement windows. At the back of the house is a two-story hyphen connecting the main block to what was historically described as a bath house. The architectural styling outside and inside is Colonial Revival.

The guest house is located south of the main house, and was built sometime after 1918, as it does not appear on the landscape plan of that date. It is a single-story three bay wood frame with a hip roof and a central chimney. Its entry is sheltered by a gabled portico supported by Tuscan columns. The interior, which as four rooms, is finished in tongue-and-groove sheathing.

The boathouse lies southeast of the main house; it is a modest 1 1/2-story wood-frame structure set on a U-shaped concrete base, providing access to the water. Above the wide boat entrance is a small balcony accessed by French doors.

== History ==
The origins of the Dreamhome estate lie in the deeding of some of the land to Bessie Collier Ellery in 1916 by her father, Edmund Collier. The Ellerys are presumed to have built on the land soon thereafter, hiring Harold Hall Blossom of Dedham, Massachusetts, to design the grounds in 1918. The source of the Ellery fortune is believed to have been in the textile industry, and enabled them to acquire 125 acres (51 ha), including about a half-mile of waterfront on the west side of the lake in Woodstock and Greenwood. The Ellerys suffered financial reverses in the Great Depression, and the two towns acquired the properties through tax-related proceedings. This original estate has since undergone some subdivision, leaving the heart of the property on 16 acres.

The estate as developed by the Ellerys was on a scale more typically seen in coastal Maine, while the interior tended to be developed into hunting camps and more generally rustic facilities.

== See also ==
- Lake Christopher (Bryant Pond)
- National Register of Historic Places listings in Oxford County, Maine
