= Telstar High School =

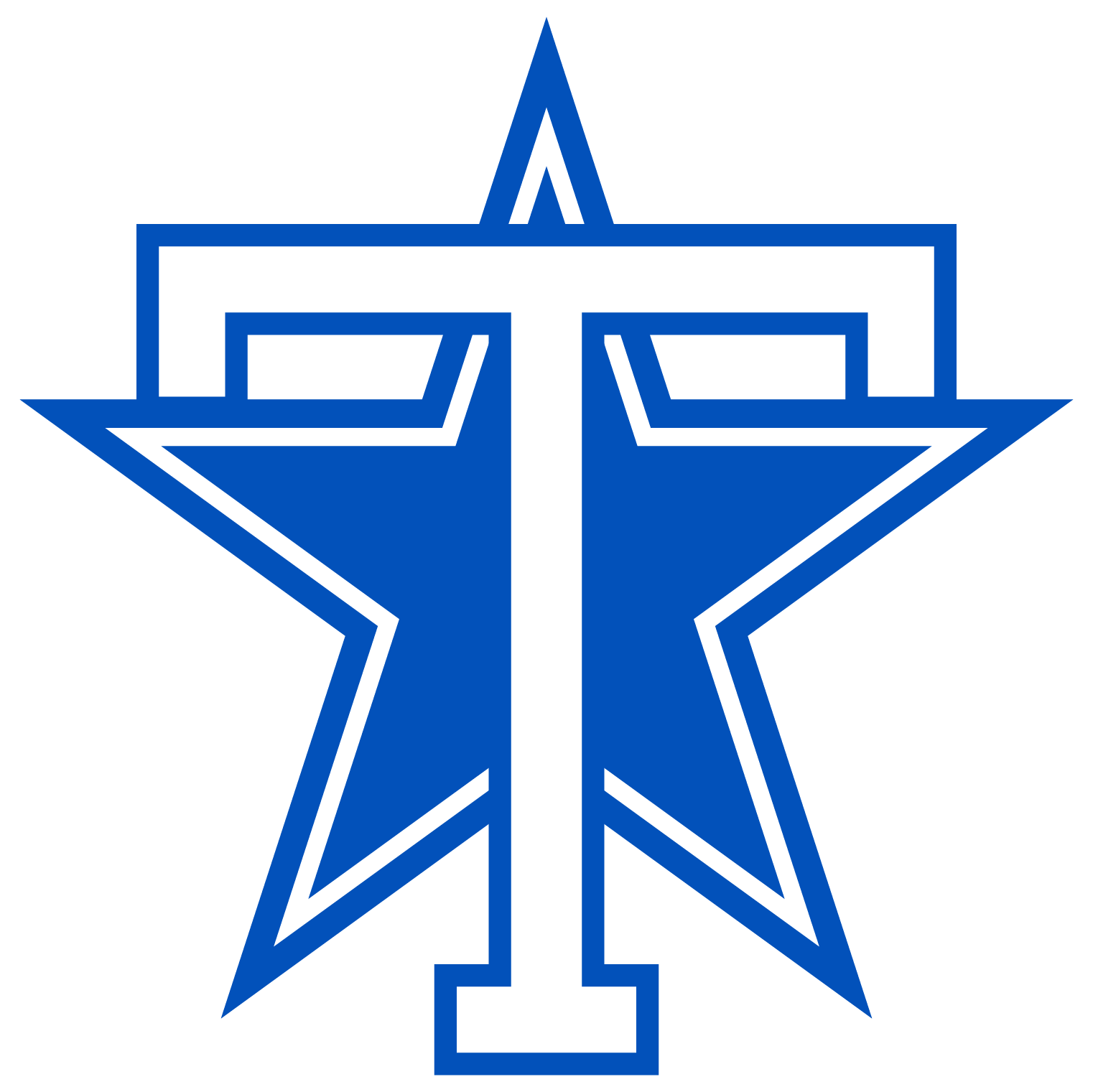

Location
- 284 Walkers Mills Rd. Bethel, Oxford, Maine 04217; United States; 44°25′7″N 70°45′55″W

Information
- Founded: 1968
- School district: MSAD 44
- Superintendent: Mark Kenney
- Principal: John Eliot
- Teaching staff: 16.80 (FTE)
- Grades: 9-12
- Student to teacher ratio: 10.00
- Colors: Columbia blue White; Navy
- Athletics: Football, Field Hockey, Nordic Skiing, Alpine Skiing, Soccer, Baseball, Softball, Track, Cross Country.
- Sports: Football, Field Hockey, Soccer, Cross Country Running. (Fall) Basketball, Alpine Skiing, Cross Country Skiing. (Winter) Baseball, Softball, Track & Field. (Spring)
- Mascot: Yosemite Sam
- Nickname: Rebels
- Communities served: Woodstock, Greenwood, Bethel, Newry
- Website: sad44.org

Telstar High School (Telstar or THS) is a high school located in Bethel, Maine, in the United States as part of Maine School Administrative District 44.

== History ==
The school was founded in 1968 and named after Telstar — the satellite's Andover Earth Station is in the school district, in Andover. In 1968, a controversy brewed up when a local Baptist minister attempted to get the school to not use the novels Demian by Hermann Hesse, The Emperor of Ice-Cream by Brian More, and Flowers for Algernon by Daniel Keyes in an English class.

== Notable alumni ==
- Simon Dumont - Professional Skier
- Lisa Piccirillo - Mathematician known for determining that the Conway knot is not a slice knot
- Anna Willard - Professional Runner

== Budget issues ==
District property valuations also caused issues within the district itself. With several million dollar homes in the vicinity of Sunday River Ski Resort, the tax base of the area keeps rising. Increasing valuations have led to a dramatic decrease in state aid, resulting in a dramatic decrease in the 2009-2010 district budget.

While property valuations have increased, many middle income jobs have been lost due to economic conditions and the poor business climate for the area's paper industry. Sunday River itself, able to weather just about any economic crisis, shed 32 full-time positions in 2009. The loss of jobs in the area have brought about a steady decrease in the school population as families move away seeking employment.

In the summer of 2009, district officials invited taxpayers to share their views on a possible $5-million-dollar addition to the school, which would cost taxpayers roughly $300,000 per year over the next 15 years. At this meeting, held at the end of July, voters shared their perspectives. Following the meeting, the SAD 44 School Board met and decided to put the proposal out to voters.
