= Slice genus =

Property of knots in mathematics

In mathematics, the slice genus of a smooth knot K in S^{3} (sometimes called its Murasugi genus or 4-ball genus) is the least integer g such that K is the boundary of a connected, compact, orientable 2-manifold S of genus g properly embedded in the 4-ball D^{4} bounded by S^{3}.

More precisely, if S is required to be smoothly embedded, then this integer g is the smooth slice genus of K and is often denoted g_{s}(K) or g_{4}(K), whereas if S is required only to be topologically locally flatly embedded then g is the topologically locally flat slice genus of K. (There is no point considering g if S is required only to be a topological embedding, since the cone on K is a 2-disk with genus 0.) There can be an arbitrarily great difference between the smooth and the topologically locally flat slice genus of a knot; a theorem of Michael Freedman says that if the Alexander polynomial of K is 1, then the topologically locally flat slice genus of K is 0, but it can be proved in many ways (originally with gauge theory) that for every g there exist knots K such that the Alexander polynomial of K is 1 while the genus and the smooth slice genus of K both equal g.

The (smooth) slice genus of a knot K is bounded below by a quantity involving the Thurston–Bennequin invariant of K:

$$g_s(K) \ge ({\rm TB}(K)+1)/2. \,$$

The (smooth) slice genus is zero if and only if the knot is concordant to the unknot.

== See also ==
- Slice knot
- Knot genus
- Milnor conjecture (topology)
