= Crescent Park Elementary School =

Crescent Park Elementary School may refer to:

- An elementary school in Maine School Administrative District 44, Maine, United States
- An elementary school in School District 36 Surrey, Surrey, British Columbia, Canada
