= Bessie Bell Collier =

American violinist (1885–1969)

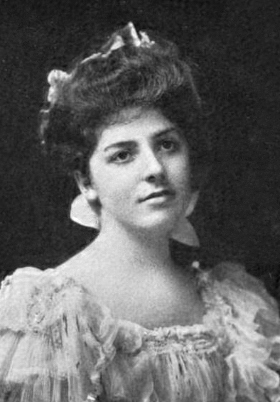
- Bessie Bell Collier, from a 1910 publication
- Born: April 3, 1885; Cohasset, Massachusetts
- Died: April 4, 1969 (aged 84)
- Other names: Bessie Collier Ellery
- Occupation: Violinist

Bessie Bell Collier Ellery (April 3, 1885 – April 4, 1969) was an American violinist. She was also original owner, with her husband William Ellery, of Dreamhome, a summer estate in Maine.

== Early life ==
Bessie Bell Collier was born in Cohasset, Massachusetts, the eldest of five children born to Edmund Pomeroy Collier and Ella Bell Sargent Collier. From ages 8 to 18, she studied violin with Franz Kneisel. She was already known for her musical skills and performing at concerts by age 10. As a young woman she played the violin at society events in Cohasset, with her sister Grace Anna playing piano.

== Career ==
Bessie Bell Collier was a violinist. She made her professional debut at Steinert Hall in Boston in 1905. She appeared as a soloist with the Boston Symphony, the New York Symphony, the St. Paul Symphony, and others. In 1910–1911 she was a soloist at Walter Damrosch's Philharmonic Concerts for Young People. "Miss Collier's ability does not lie in digital expertness, nor in a precise articulation of the bow," commented The Boston Globe in 1912. "Her playing indicates a refined mind, sensibility to emotion, and a respect for her instrument as a medium for interpretation rather than of mere display."

In 1913 Collier and singer Marie Sundelius gave a benefit concert to raise funds for the American Red Cross for flood victims. She gave benefit concerts during World War I for the French Wounded Fund. She also funded a scholarship for women students of her old teacher, Franz Kneisel, when he taught at Kneisel Hall in Blue Hill, Maine.

The Ellerys built Dreamhome, a summer estate in Woodstock, Maine, in 1916. They wrote about their gardens for botanical publications.

== Personal life ==
Bessie Bell Collier married Boston wool merchant William Ellery in 1914, in Boston. She was widowed when William died in 1961. She died in 1969, aged 84 years, in Massachusetts.
