= Lisa Piccirillo =

American mathematician

- Born: Lisa Marie Piccirillo; 1990 or 1991 (age 35–36); Greenwood, Maine, U.S.
- Education: Boston College (BS, 2013), University of Texas at Austin (PhD, 2019)
- Known for: Determining the slice property of the Conway knot
- Awards: Maryam Mirzakhani New Frontiers Prize (2021), Clay Research Fellowship (2021), Sloan Research Fellowship (2021)
- Scientific career
- Fields: Low-dimensional topology, knot theory
- Workplaces: Brandeis University, Massachusetts Institute of Technology, University of Texas at Austin
- Thesis: Knot traces and the slice genus (2019)
- Doctoral advisor: John Edwin Luecke

Lisa Marie Piccirillo (born 1990 or 1991) is an American mathematician specializing in low-dimensional topology. She is a Professor and holds the Sid W. Richardson Foundation Regents Chair in Mathematics at the University of Texas at Austin. She is known for solving a long-standing problem in knot theory by proving in 2018 that the Conway knot is not smoothly slice.

== Early life and education ==
Piccirillo was raised in Greenwood, Maine, and attended Telstar Regional High School in Bethel, Maine. Her mother was a middle school math teacher. As a child, her hobbies included riding dressage, church youth group activities, drama, and band.

She earned a B.S. in mathematics from Boston College in 2013 and a PhD in low-dimensional topology at the University of Texas at Austin under the supervision of John Edwin Luecke in 2019. Boston College professor Elisenda Grigsby noted Piccirillo's creativity as a key to her success, adding that Piccirillo did not fit the mold of a "standard golden child math prodigy" during her undergraduate studies.

== Career ==
After earning her doctorate, Piccirillo was a postdoctoral researcher at Brandeis University. Following the publication of her proof on the Conway knot, she was offered a tenure-track position at the Massachusetts Institute of Technology, where she served as an assistant professor of mathematics from 2020 to 2024. In 2024, she returned to the University of Texas at Austin as a full professor.

=== The Conway knot problem ===
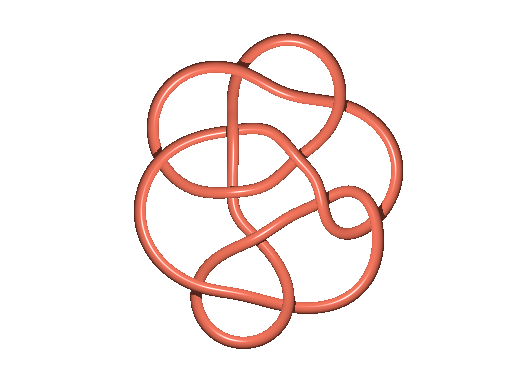
The Conway Knot

The Conway knot is named after its discoverer, English mathematician John Horton Conway, who first described it in 1970. While the knot was determined to be topologically slice in the 1980s, the question of whether it was smoothly slice remained unanswered for fifty years, becoming a famous unsolved problem in knot theory.

Piccirillo's proof, developed while she was a graduate student, completed the classification of slice knots with fewer than 13 crossings. Her work was hailed for its creative methodology; instead of attacking the problem directly, she constructed a "trace" of the Conway knot and found a different knot that shared this trace but was already known not to be smoothly slice. This novel approach demonstrated that the Conway knot was also not slice and, according to The Washington Post, "could point to new ways to understand knots."

Piccirillo learned of the problem at a 2018 conference and reportedly found the solution in less than a week. In an interview, she described her initial approach to the problem:

I think the next day, which was a Sunday, I just started trying to run the approach for fun and I worked on it a bit in the evenings just to try to see what's supposed to be hard about this problem.

A few days later, she met with Cameron Gordon, a professor at UT Austin (a senior topologist), and casually mentioned her solution. Reflecting on the nature of her discovery in an interview with Quanta Magazine, Piccirillo noted the specificity of her proof in a field that often favors broad generalizations:

It was quite surprising to me. I mean, it's just one knot. In general, when mathematicians prove things, we like to prove really broad, general statements: All objects like this have some property. And I proved like, one knot has a thing. I don't care about knots. So, I do care about three and four dimensional spaces, though. And it turns out that, when you want to study three and four dimensional spaces, you find yourself studying knots anyway...

== Recognition ==
For her work on the Conway knot, Piccirillo has received several prestigious awards:

- In 2021, she was one of the inaugural recipients of the Maryam Mirzakhani New Frontiers Prize, which recognizes outstanding early-career women mathematicians.
- In 2021, she was awarded a Clay Research Fellowship, given to recent PhDs of unusual promise, and a Sloan Research Fellowship, which honors "early-career researchers of outstanding promise."

In 2020, the UK magazine Prospect included her on its list of "The world's top 50 thinkers for the Covid-19 age."

== See also ==
- List of female mathematicians
- History of knot theory
