= Maine School Administrative District 44 =

School district in Maine, United States

- Logo

Address
- One Parkway Suite 204 Bethel, Maine, 04217; United States
- Coordinates: 44°30′N 70°45′W

District information
- Type: Public
- Grades: PreK–12
- NCES District ID: 2311670

Students and staff
- Students: 672 (2023-2024)
- Teachers: 65.20 (on an FTE basis)
- Staff: 191.20 (on an FTE basis)
- Student–teacher ratio: 10.31:1

Other information
- Website: www.sad44.org

Maine School Administrative District 44 (MSAD 44 or SAD 44) is a school district containing the towns of Bethel, Gilead, Greenwood, Newry, and Woodstock, in Oxford County, Maine, United States.

== Schools ==
The school district is composed of the following schools:

- Crescent Park Elementary School in Bethel
  - Principal: Tanya Arsenault
- Woodstock Elementary School in Bryant Pond
  - Principal: Beth Clarke
- Telstar Middle School in Bethel
  - Principal: Lindsay Luetje
- Telstar High School
  - Principal: John Eliot
