= Lake Christopher =

Lake in Maine

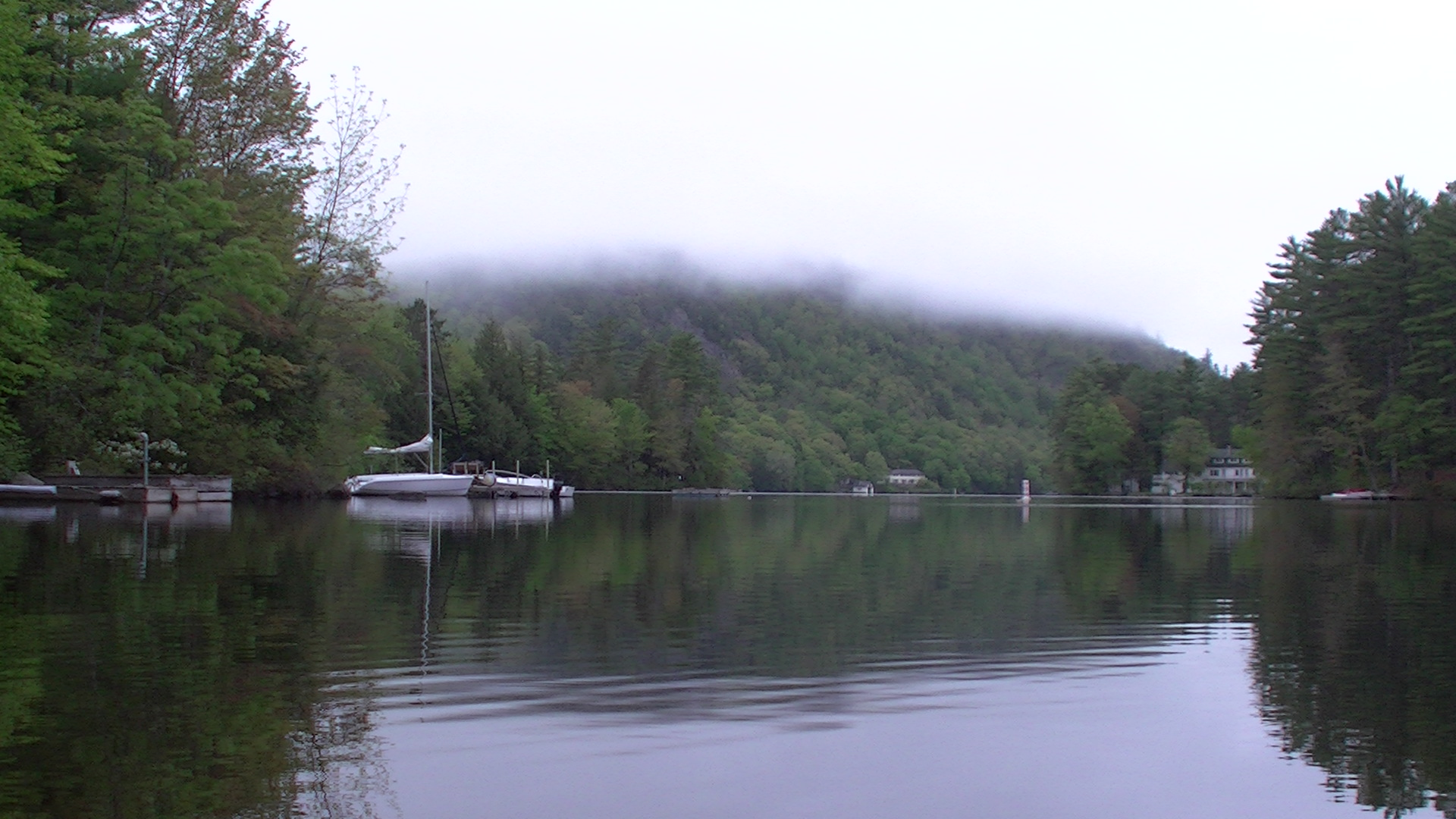
- Lake Christopher (Bryant Pond) on a cloudy day.

- Location within Maine Location within the United States
- Location: Oxford County, Maine
- Coordinates: 44.376°N 70.651°W
- Primary inflows: Spring fed and two very small streams
- Primary outflows: Little Androscoggin River
- Basin countries: United States
- Surface area: 276 acres (1.1 km^{2})
- Average depth: 33 feet (10 m)
- Max. depth: 63 feet (19 m)
- Residence time: 2 years (Note: Listed as 0.5 flushes per year, which converts to a residence time of 2 years.)
- Shore length^{1}: 4.3 miles (6.9 km)
- Surface elevation: 100 feet (30 m)
- Settlements: Bryant Pond, Maine and Greenwood, Maine
- ^{1} Shore length is not a well-defined measure.

Lake Christopher, also known as Bryant Pond, is a two-mile long lake in western Maine. The lake is located in the towns of Woodstock and Greenwood in Oxford County, Maine.

== Geography ==
Lake Christopher sits directly northeast of Mount Christopher, a steeply sloped peak. This lake is very deep for its relatively small size compared to other Maine lakes. With a maximum depth of 63 feet (19 meters) deep, it has a volume of 9,172 acre-feet and a surface area of only 276 acres, giving a volume-to-surface area ratio of 33:1 (acre-feet to acres), one of the highest in Oxford County.

Lake Christopher's inflow is mainly spring-fed. There is some inflow from two very small streams connected to small ponds on the east side of the lake. Outflow is a stream that becomes the Little Androscoggin River. Water from the lake is not ideal for drinking, partially due to high levels of colored dissolved organic matter, so local residents get drinking water from a nearby spring on Route 26.

There is a small shallow beach area at the northwest end of the lake and a boat ramp at southeast end. Although the lake is only a short distance away from South Pond, Maine, on a map, there is no waterway connecting the two bodies of water.

An infestation of the invasive plant called variable leaf milfoil (Myriophyllum heterophyllum) began in a cove on the northeast side of the lake in 2002. Over the years, there has been a gradual recovery, with most milfoil eradicated by 2020.

The lake is home to loons, herons, and many species of songbirds.

Several species of fish dwell in the lake, including brook trout, largemouth bass, and landlocked salmon. Winter ice fishing is popular on this lake.

There are two other lakes known as Bryant Pond in Maine, one in Hiram, Oxford county, and another in Fort Fairfield, Aroostook county.

== History ==
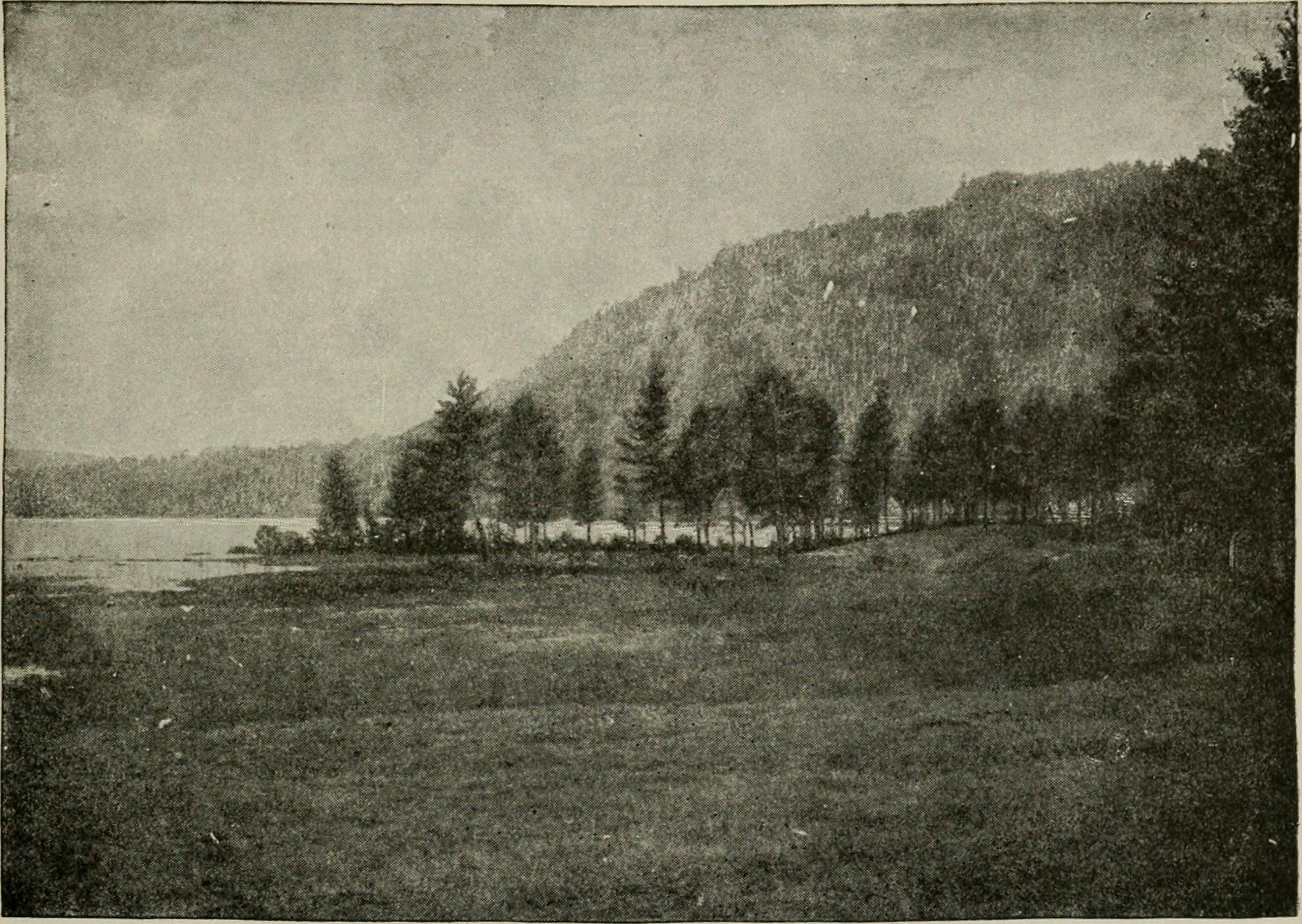
Lake Christopher as seen from the railroad in 1892.

The names Bryant Pond and Lake Christopher come from the brothers Christopher and Solomon Bryant, who originally settled the area. The first child born in the settlement was named Christopher Bryant Jr. The Bryant family played a large role in settling the area around the lake when Maine was still part of Massachusetts. Roads connected the lake to neighboring towns of Paris and Rumford in 1796. The railroad through town was added in 1851 as part of the route to connect Portland, Maine, to Montreal, Canada. The lake was historically referred to as Bryant's Pond in reference to the Bryant's Pond railroad station.

There was a steam-powered spool mill built in 1875 on the shore of the lake. Oxford county was a lead producer of thread spools.

Principal industries in the area surrounding the lake were listed as "lumbering and farming" in the year 1919.

In the 20th century a large sawmill and clothespin factory operated on the eastern shore of the lake.

The lake's location on the railroad route was historically important for summer tourism. The railroad, called the Grand Trunk Railroad or the Atlantic and St. Lawrence Railroad, once a passenger rail, is still operating for cargo only. It runs from Grey, Maine, to Bethel, Maine, Grafton Notch, through New Hampshire, and eventually to Canada, alongside route 26 for most of its path.

== See also ==
- Dreamhome
- Greenwood, Maine
- Maine State Route 26
- Oxford County, Maine
- St. Lawrence and Atlantic Railroad
- Woodstock, Maine
