= Forestdale School =

Forestdale School may refer to

== Maine ==
  - Forestdale School (Maine), an SDA school in Woodstock, Maine

== Massachusetts ==
- Forestdale School (Massachusetts), a school in Sandwich, Massachusetts
- Forestdale School (Malden, Massachusetts), a school in Malden, Massachusetts.
