= Forestdale School (Maine) =

Forestdale Christian School

Location
- 27 Perkins Valley Road; Bryant Pond, Maine 04219; United States
- Coordinates: 44°21′44″N 70°33′10″W

Information
- School type: Tuition, Private Christian
- Religious affiliation: Seventh-day Adventist Church county
- Established: 1932
- Status: Open Continuously since established in 1932.
- School board: By appointment
- Authority: Northern New England Conference of Seventh Day Adventists, Westbrook ME.
- Superintendent: Sonia Edwards
- Principal: Neil Clauson
- Chaplain: Steve Dayen
- Grades: K–10
- Classes offered: Fully State Accredited
- Accreditation: State of Maine
- Website: www.forestdalechristianschool.com

Forestdale Christian School is a Seventh-day Adventist school located in Bryant Pond, Maine. Educating grades K–10, it is located off Perkins Valley Road at the foot of Mollyockett Mountain connected to the Woodstock SDA on a plot of rural land.
