= George Lorenzo Noyes =

George "Shavey" Lorenzo Noyes (August 30, 1863 – 1945) was an American mineralogist, naturalist, development critic, writer and landscape artist. He was known as the thoreauvian of Maine.

== Biography ==
Noyes was born in Norway, Maine, and was the son of Amos Oscar Noyes and Anna Chase Noyes. Since A. Oscar Noyes neglected the family as he was away much of the time attending to his business interests and civic commitments, George's mother Anna had the most influence on him. As a result, young George spent extended periods with his grandfather Chase in the western mountains of Maine where he came to embrace the solitude of the Maine wilderness, rejecting formal education and organized religion.

In the summer of 1890, while in Fryeburg, Maine, George went to the nearby White Mountain artist colony in North Conway, New Hampshire to pursue his interest in art and talked with some of the many artists who came there every summer. It is not known how many artists he met, but it's on record that George spent the day and night at the home of Benjamin Champney, the famous landscape artist.

Noyes kept an undated journal in which he wrote his thoughts on life, God, religion, children, war, pitfalls of modern life and the spiritual beauty of nature. The writing style addressed the presence of a future reader and makes frequent use of colloquial spellings to make points. Much of his writing takes the form of allegories in which he comments on the absurdity of social norms and human folly. The 1,500-page journal was profusely illustrated with some 300 monochrome ink wash landscapes and pencil sketches, many in a chiaroscuro style, capturing atmospheric lighting conditions. These paintings, influenced by the White Mountain art style, were masterfully done with confident bold strokes and surprising textural details as captured only by someone who lived close to nature. His creative work expresses his lifelong optimism and belief that nature was the divine expression of God.

In the 1920s the Erichman Print Gallery of New York city had an exhibition of a number of his paintings and sketches. Although a well-known artist, due to his particular solitary wilderness life, he never pursued art as a livelihood but as a private expression of his spiritual reverence for nature. During his life he worked as a mineral collector and operated the Noyes Mountain Quarry in Greenwood, Maine, known today as the Harvard Quarry. Many of the finds made there are in museums, including the Field Museum of Natural History Chicago.

Noyes counted among his friends and associates George R. and Freeland Howe, Robert Bickford, Vivian Akers, Tim Heath, George Frederick Kunz, and others. In 1884 George married Belle H. Smith, they suffered the death of an infant son and had one surviving child Max. It appears that before or about 1905 George and Belle were separated. With their only child, Max serving in World War I, George by his own admission writes he is again alone and "orphaned" to the world.

After his death in 1945, his journal and paintings were discovered and remained in a private family collection until 2007 when nearly all of the paintings and much of the manuscript was auctioned off to collectors.

== See also ==
- Simple living
