= Anna Willard =

American middle-distance runner

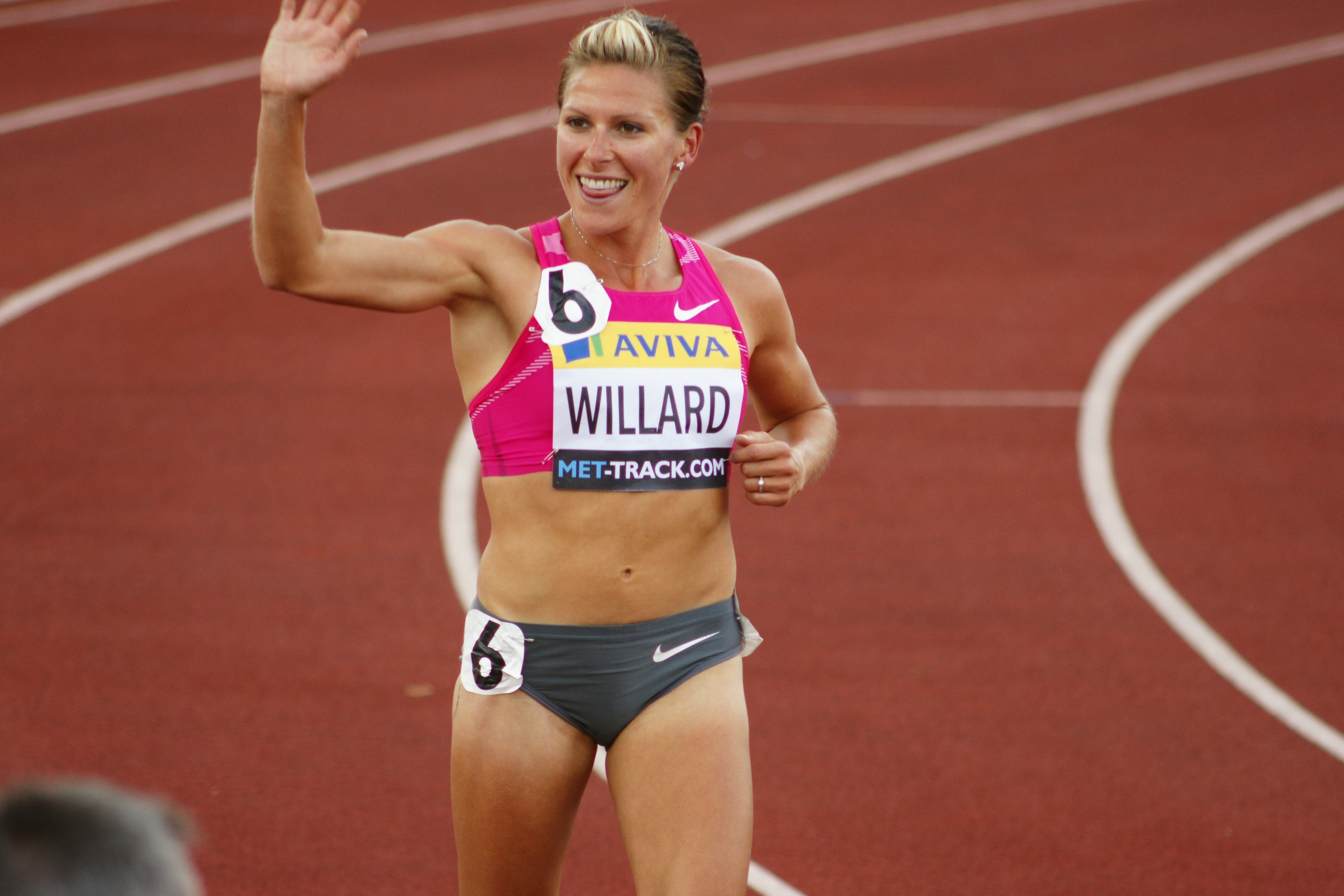
- Anna Willard after winning the 1500 m at the 2009 London Grand Prix

Personal information
- Born: March 31, 1984 (age 42) Portland, Maine
- Height: 5 ft 4 in (1.63 m)
- Weight: 120 lb (54 kg)

Sport
- Country: United States
- Event(s): Steeplechase, 1500 m, 800 m, One mile
- College team: Michigan Wolverines, Brown Bears
- Coached by: Terrence Mahon

Achievements and titles
- Olympic finals: 2008, Steeplechase, 10th
- World finals: 2007, Steeplechase 8th 2009, 1500 m, 6th
- Personal best(s): 800 m: 1:58.80 1500 m: 3:59.38 Steeplechase: 9:22.76

Anna Willard Grenier (born March 31, 1984) is an American middle distance runner.

== Personal life ==
Willard grew up on a farm in Greenwood, Maine. She took up running as a high school student at Telstar High School in Bethel, Maine. She competed as an undergraduate for Brown University and as a graduate student for the University of Michigan. Because Willard missed a track season at Brown due to injury, she had not exhausted her athletic eligibility prior to graduation. Therefore, she was able to compete for Michigan in 2007 as a graduate student.

Anna became engaged to fellow American steeplechaser Jonathan Pierce at the 2008 U.S. Olympic trials and went by the name Anna Pierce during her marriage. She divorced Jonathan in 2014 and moved from London to Boston. She is especially known for dyeing her hair unusual colors. Her hair was blonde with pink streaks at the 2008 U.S. Olympic trials, and she dyed it purple before the 2008 Summer Olympics.

== Career ==
Willard set the U.S. women's record for the 3000 meter steeplechase of 9:27.56 at the 2008 United States Olympic track and field trials on July 3, 2008, in Eugene, Oregon, en route to qualifying for the United States Olympic team.

Willard's U.S. steeplechase record was eclipsed by teammate Jennifer Barringer at the 2008 Summer Olympics. Willard qualified for the Olympic final by finishing sixth in her heat, and placed tenth in the final with a time of 9:25.63.

In 2009, Anna focused more on her 1500 m and 800 m racing. She was victorious at the USA Indoor 1500 m, and the 800 m at the Reebok Grand Prix and a Golden League meet in Paris. Anna chose to run only in the 1500 m at the World Championships in Berlin, finishing 6th with a time of 4:06.19.

=== 2015 ===
Event Result Venue Date
1000m ind. 2:45.28 Boston (USA) 13.02.2015
1500m 4:26.61 Palo Alto (USA) 03.04.2015
Mile ind. 4:45.33 Boston (USA) 30.01.2015

=== 2016 ===
Event Result Venue Date
800m 2:04.18 Waltham (USA) 04.06.2016
