= Mutation (knot theory) =

Kind of operation in knot theory

The prime Kinoshita–Terasaka knot (11n42) and the prime Conway knot (11n34) respectively, and how they are related by mutation.

In the mathematical field of knot theory, a mutation is an operation on a knot that can produce different knots. Suppose K is a knot given in the form of a knot diagram. Consider a disc D in the projection plane of the diagram whose boundary circle intersects K exactly four times. We may suppose that (after planar isotopy) the disc is geometrically round and the four points of intersection on its boundary with K are equally spaced. The part of the knot inside the disc is a tangle. There are two reflections that switch pairs of endpoints of the tangle. There is also a rotation that results from composition of the reflections. A mutation replaces the original tangle by a tangle given by any of these operations. The result will always be a knot and is called a mutant of K.

Mutants can be difficult to distinguish as they have a number of the same invariants. They have the same hyperbolic volume (by a result of Ruberman), and have the same HOMFLY polynomials.

== Examples ==
- Conway and Kinoshita-Terasaka mutant pair, distinguished as knot genus 3 and 2, respectively.
