= Arf invariant of a knot =

Knot invariant named after Cahit Arf

In the mathematical field of knot theory, the Arf invariant of a knot, named after Cahit Arf, is a knot invariant obtained from a quadratic form associated to a Seifert surface. If F is a Seifert surface of a knot, then the homology group H_{1}(F, Z/2Z) has a quadratic form whose value is the number of full twists mod 2 in a neighborhood of an embedded circle representing an element of the homology group. The Arf invariant of this quadratic form is the Arf invariant of the knot.

== Definition by Seifert matrix ==
Let $V = v_{i,j}$ be a Seifert matrix of the knot, constructed from a set of curves on a Seifert surface of genus g which represent a basis for the first homology of the surface. This means that V is a 2g × 2g matrix with the property that V − V^{T} is a symplectic matrix. The Arf invariant of the knot is the residue of

$$\sum\limits^g_{i=1} v_{2i-1,2i-1} v_{2i,2i} \pmod 2.$$

Specifically, if $\{a_i, b_i\}, i = 1 \ldots g$, is a symplectic basis for the intersection form on the Seifert surface, then

$$\operatorname{Arf}(K) = \sum\limits^g_{i=1}\operatorname{lk}\left(a_i, a_i^+\right)\operatorname{lk}\left(b_i, b_i^+\right) \pmod 2.$$

where lk is the link number and $a^+$ denotes the positive pushoff of a.

== Definition by pass equivalence ==
This approach to the Arf invariant is due to Louis Kauffman.

We define two knots to be pass equivalent if they are related by a finite sequence of pass-moves.

Every knot is pass-equivalent to either the unknot or the trefoil; these two knots are not pass-equivalent and additionally, the right- and left-handed trefoils are pass-equivalent.

Now we can define the Arf invariant of a knot to be 0 if it is pass-equivalent to the unknot, or 1 if it is pass-equivalent to the trefoil. This definition is equivalent to the one above.

== Definition by partition function ==
Vaughan Jones showed that the Arf invariant can be obtained by taking the partition function of an Ising model on a knot diagram.

== Definition by Alexander polynomial ==
This approach to the Arf invariant is by Raymond Robertello. Let

$$\Delta(t) = c_0 + c_1 t + \cdots + c_n t^n + \cdots + c_0 t^{2n}$$

be the Alexander polynomial of the knot. Then the Arf invariant is the residue of

$$c_{n-1} + c_{n-3} + \cdots + c_r$$

modulo 2, where r = 0 for n odd, and r = 1 for n even.

Kunio Murasugi proved that the Arf invariant is zero if and only if Δ(−1) ≡ ±1 modulo 8.

== Arf as knot concordance invariant ==
From the Fox-Milnor criterion, which tells us that the Alexander polynomial of a slice knot $K \subset \mathbb{S}^3$ factors as $\Delta(t) = p(t) p\left(t^{-1}\right)$ for some polynomial $p(t)$ with integer coefficients, we know that the determinant $\left| \Delta(-1) \right|$ of a slice knot is a square integer. As $\left| \Delta(-1) \right|$ is an odd integer, it has to be congruent to 1 modulo 8. Combined with Murasugi's result, this shows that the Arf invariant of a slice knot vanishes.
