= Ski Mount Abram =

Ski area in Greenwood, Maine

Mt. Abram
- Interactive map of Mt. Abram
- Location: Greenwood, Maine, United States
- Nearest city: Bethel, Maine
- Coordinates: 44°22′45″N 70°42′25″W
- Top elevation: 1,990 feet (610 m)
- Base elevation: 940 feet (290 m)
- Skiable area: 250 acres (100 ha) trail 650 acres (260 ha) total
- Trails: 44
- Lift system: 5
- Terrain parks: No
- Night skiing: No
- Website: www.mtabram.com

Mt. Abram is an independently owned ski area and mountain bike park in Greenwood, Maine, located a few miles outside of nearby Bethel, Maine. Since its founding in 1960, Mt. Abram has steadily grown from a single t-bar serviced area to a modest mountain, with over 1,150 feet (350 m) of vertical drop, four lifts servicing 10 easy, 21 Intermediate, and 13 expert trails. The lift serviced mountain bike park opened to the public in the spring of 2020 and is one of three lift-serviced mountain bike parks in state of Maine.

On July 1, 2024, Mt. Abram re-joined the Indy Pass, giving pass holders two days at the ski area with no blackouts. Mt. Abram was previously on the Indy Pass for the 2019-2020 season.

== Trails and lifts ==
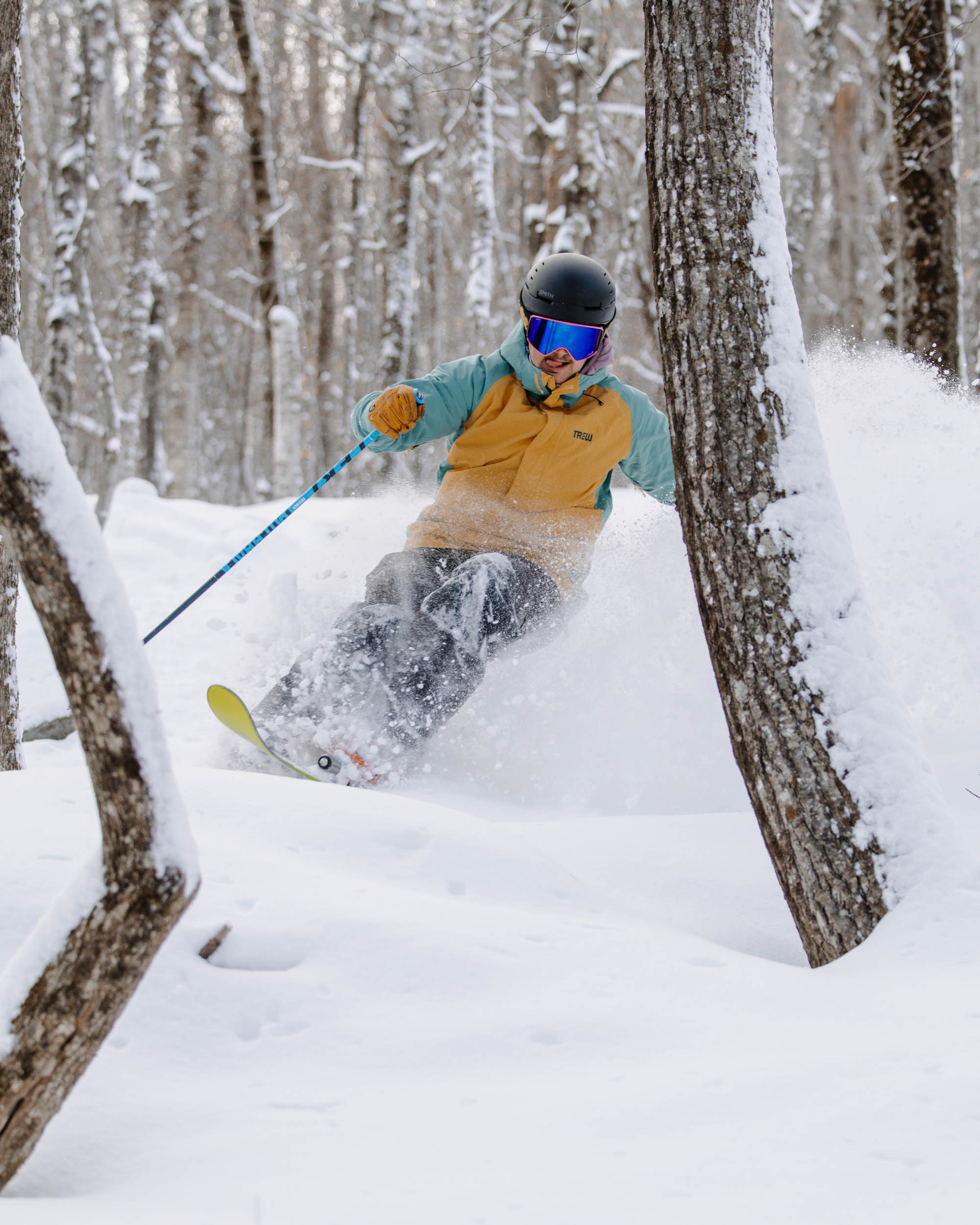
Glade skiing at Mt. Abram

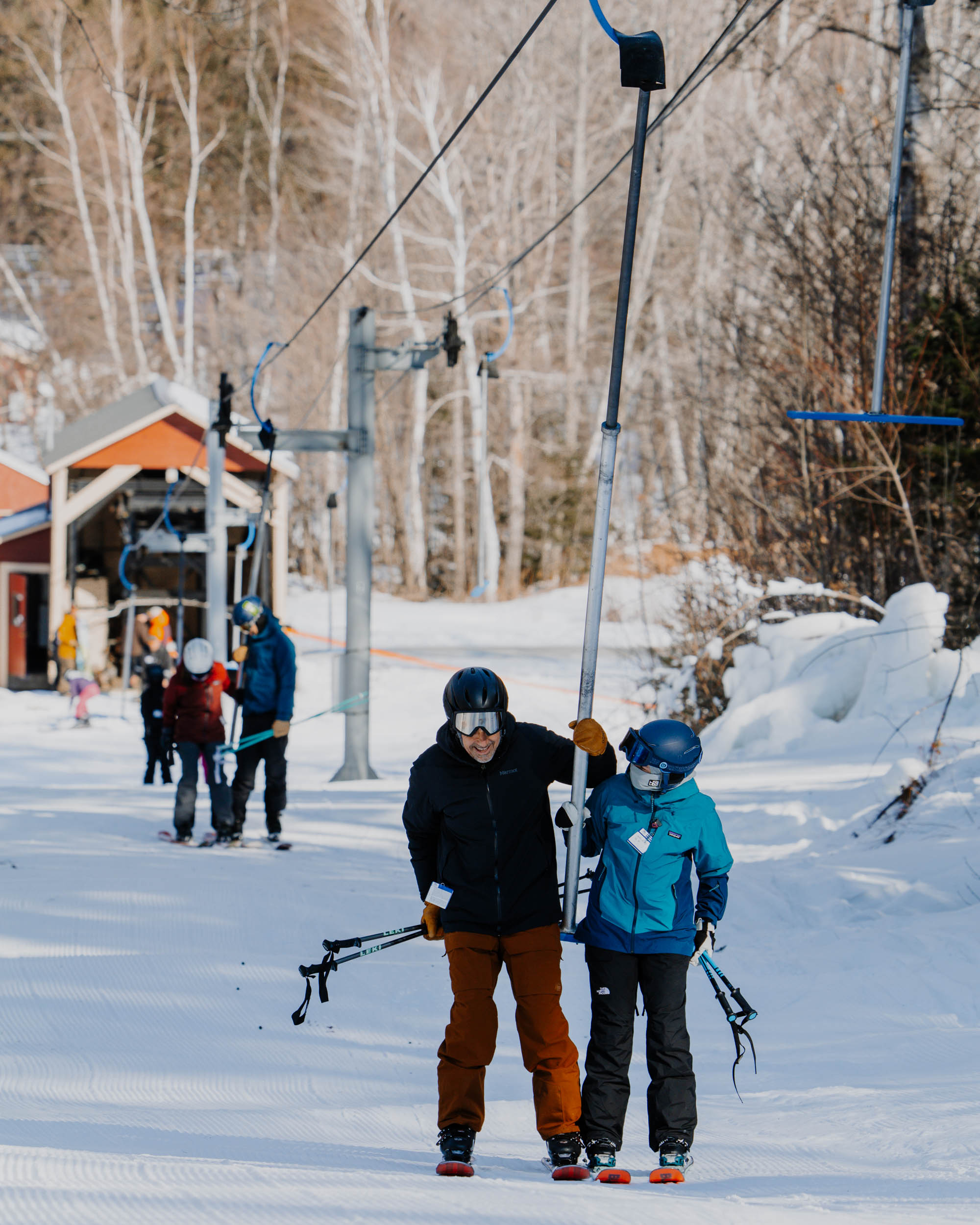
The Maine T-Bar at Mt. Abram

Mt. Abram can be broken up into two distinct areas, which are the Main Side and West Side. West Side is the beginner area which has one Double Chairlift and a magic carpet. Most lessons are taught in this area. The main part of the mountain is serviced by The Way Back Machine, a double chair built in 1970. The main mountain consists of many Black Diamonds and Blue Square trails. Most trails at "Mt. A" (a nickname given by the local community) are named after the Rocky & Bullwinkle T.V show from the late 50's. Some names include Dudley Do Right, Boris Badenov, and Natasha's Niche.

As far as lift service goes, Mt. Abram has a reliable, low-capacity lift system. All chairlifts and surface lifts at Mt. Abram are under 1,000 riders per hour, in order to prevent trail congestion and high skier traffic across the mountain.

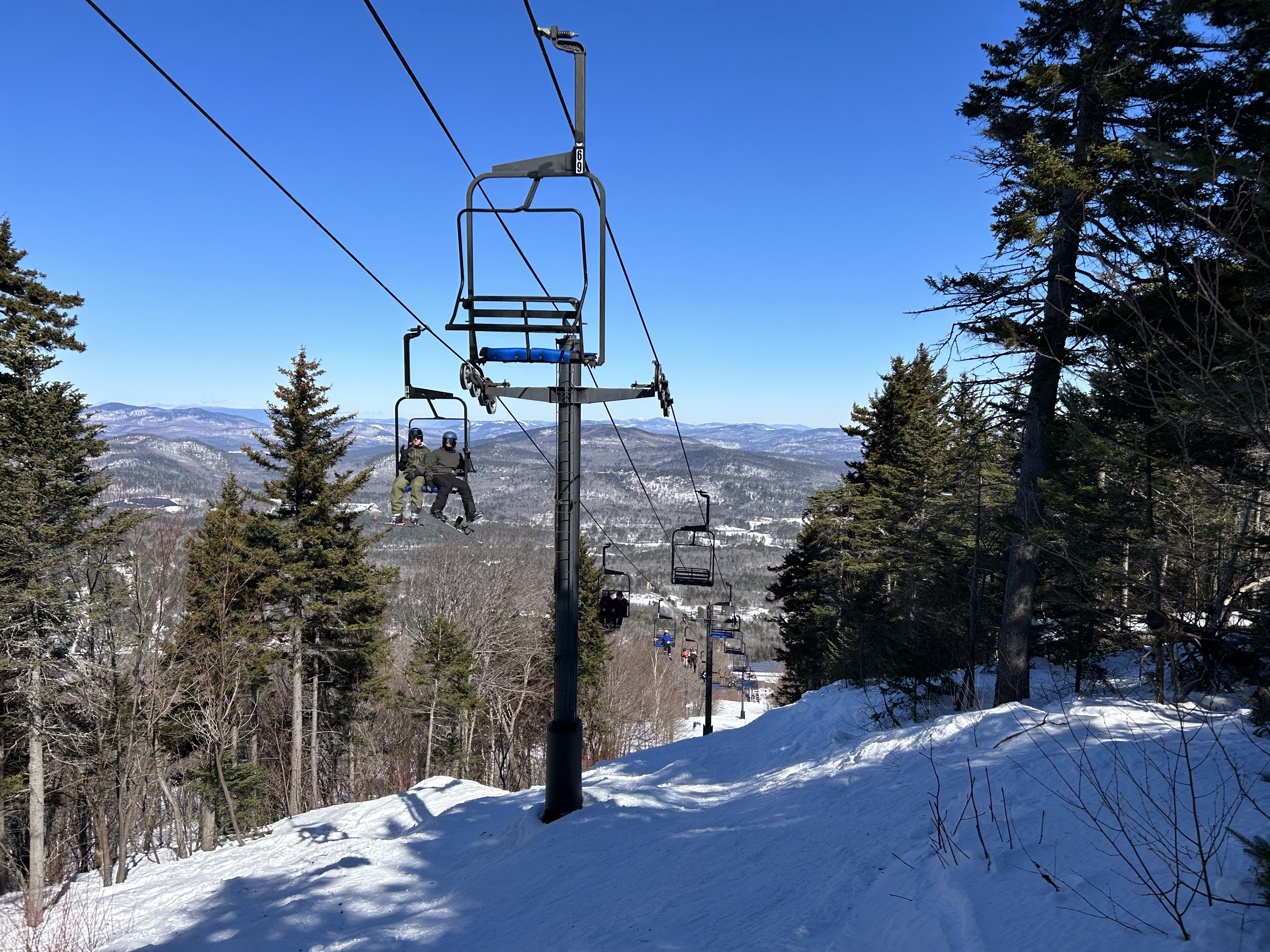
Looking down the lift line of The Wayback Machine.

Name	Type	Builder	Year built	Vertical (feet)	Length (feet)	Ride Time	Notes
The Way Back Machine	Double	Hall	1970	1037	4121	8.2	
Skyline	Double	Hall	1988	461	3300	8.4	Relocated from Pico, Vermont.
The Maine T	T-Bar	Hall	1960				First lift at Mt. Abram.
Mini T	T-Bar	Poma	1965	300	1800	4.2	Retired in 2023
Sawicki	Magic Carpet		2011				Runs near the Westside lodge.

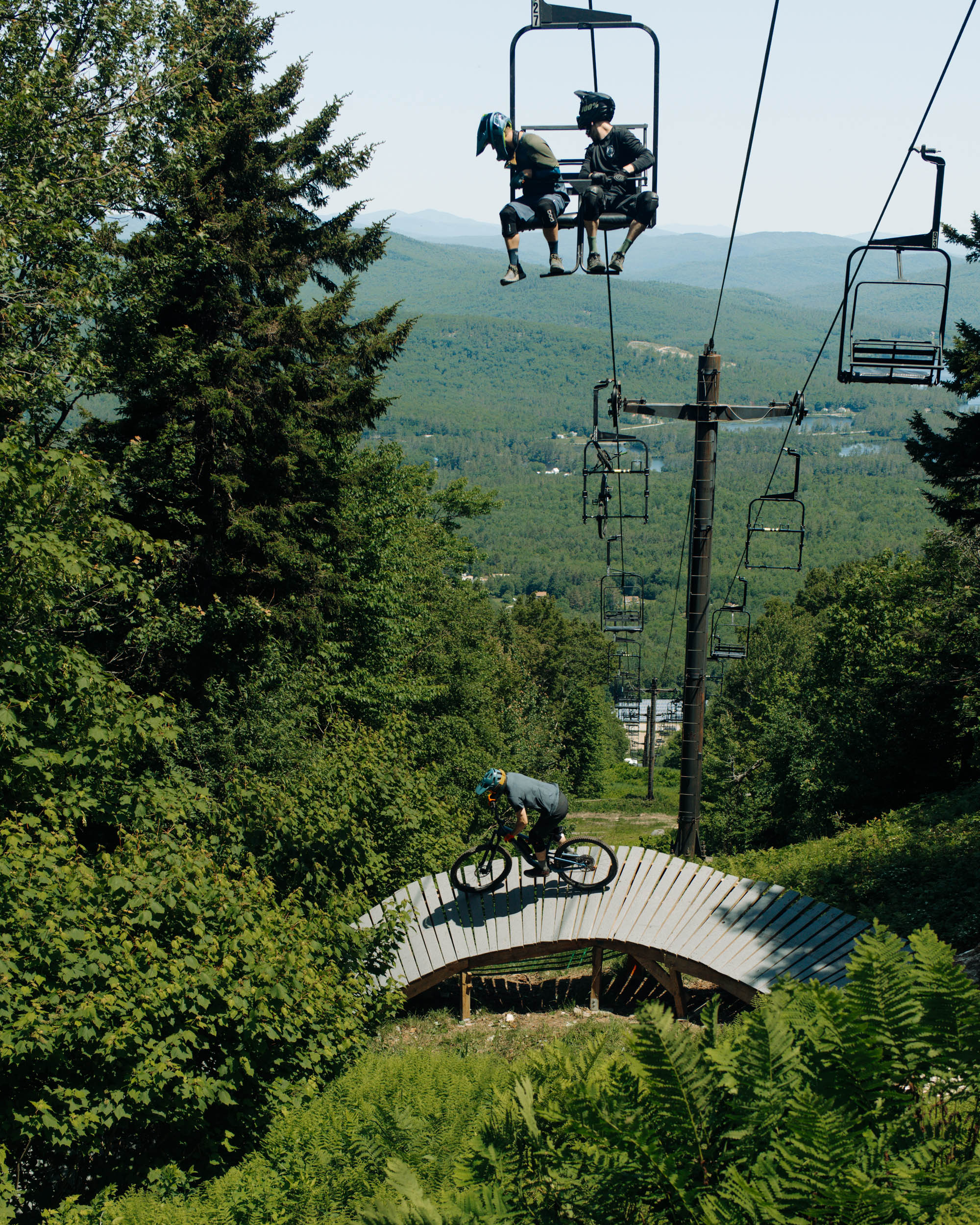
PB & C trail at Mt. Abram Bike Park

== Mountain Bike Park ==
Mt. Abram began building their lift service mountain bike park in 2019 and it opened to the public in the spring of 2020. The Bike Park operates out of the Westside of the mountain and typically runs from Memorial Day through mid October. Over the years they have added more trails and in 2022 they debuted a trail system from the summit with advanced and expert terrain that can be accessed by the Way Back Machine chairlift. In the Fall of 2024 Mt. Abram debuted the Maine Line trail, which is an advanced jump line featuring drops, gap jumps, spines and more.

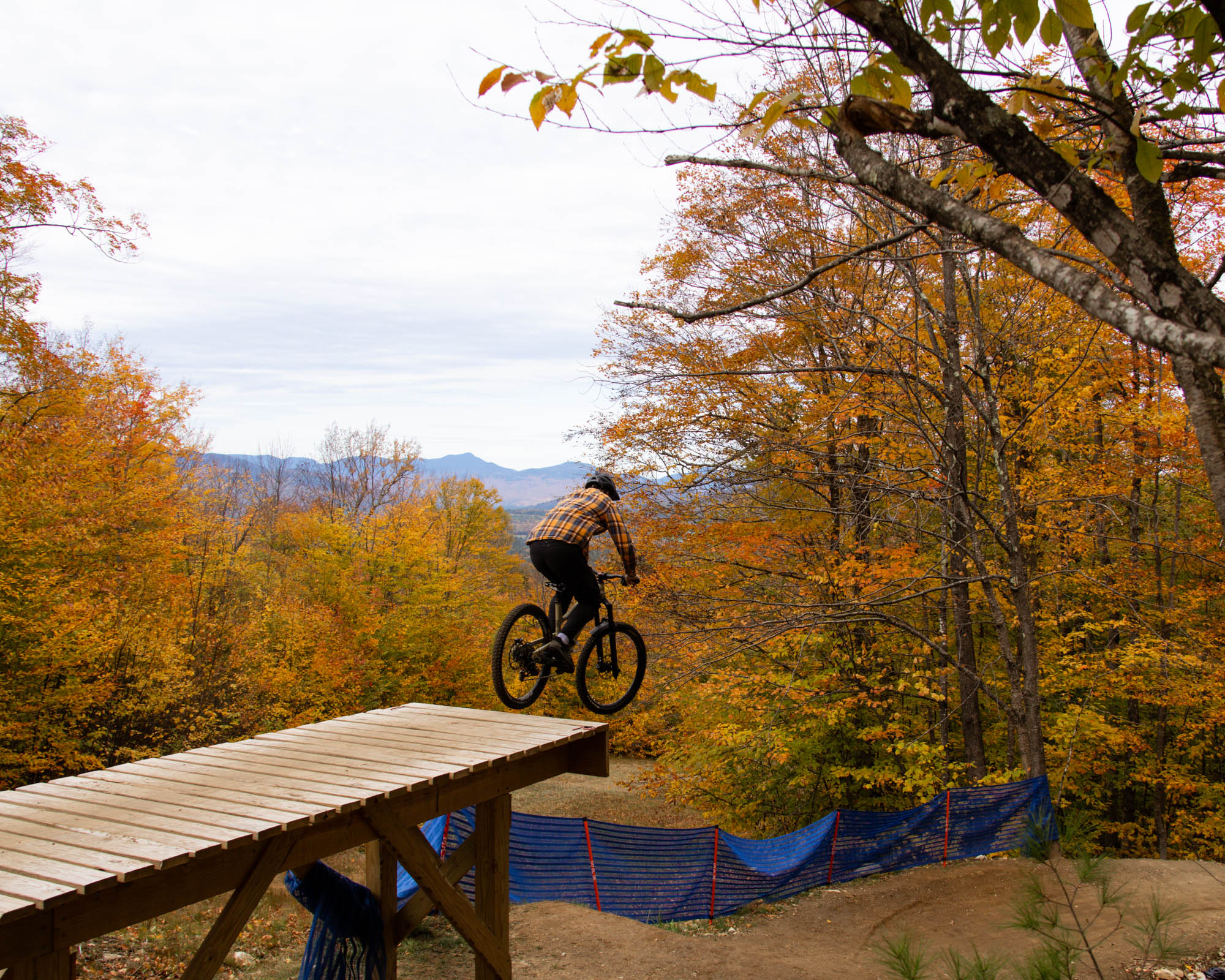
Maine Line trail at Mt. Abram

Current trails as of 2025:

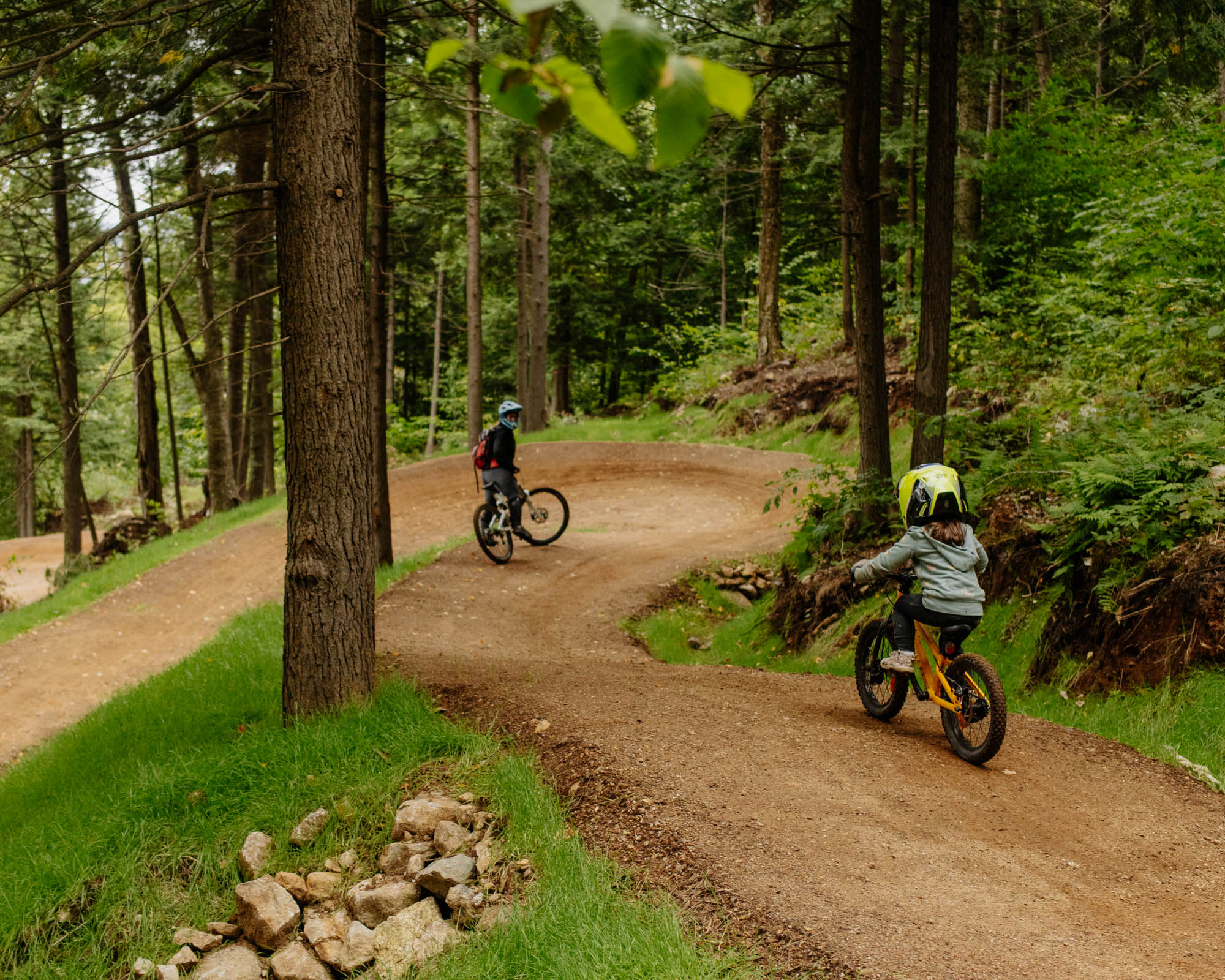
George's Jungle at Mt. Abram Bike Park

Trail Name	Level	Location	Description	Year built
Super Chicken	Green	Westside	Wide machine built flow trail	2019
George's Jungle	Green	Westside	Wide machine built flow trail	2019
Grease Slapper	Blue	Westside	Wide machine built flow trail with larger berms and tabletops	2019
Whiplash	Blue	Westside	Wide machine built flow trail featuring larger berms, tabletops, jumps and spines	2020
Pinball Wizard	Blue	Westside	Hand built technical trail featuring rock gardens, roll downs and switchbacks	2019
Yellow Jacket	Black	Westside	Hand built technical trail featuring rock gardens, roll downs, drops and bridges	2020
Rock Bottom	Black	Westside	Hand built technical trail featuring advanced rock gardens, bridges and roll downs	2020
Ghoster	Black	Mainside	Hand built technical trail featuring rock gardens, roll downs & off camber turns	2021
Bedrocker	Double Black	Mainside	Hand built technical trail featuring rock gardens, roll downs & long rock slabs	2022
PB & C	Double Black	Mainside	Hand built technical trail featuring rock gardens, roll downs, drops and wooden berms. (This trail ends at the Main Side)	2022
Maineline	Double Black	Mainside	Machine built advanced jump line featuring mandatory drops, gap jumps, spines and more.	2024
