= Noyes Mountain (Maine) =

Mountain in Maine, United States

- Location within Maine

Highest point
- Elevation: 1,503 ft (458 m)
- Prominence: 743 ft (230 m)
- Coordinates: 44°17′30″N 70°38′19″W

Geography
- Location: Oxford County, Maine, U.S.
- Topo map(s): USGS Greenwood, ME

Noyes Mountain is a mountain located in Maine near the town of South Paris. It is named after George Lorenzo Noyes, who built and operated Harvard Quarry located nearby.

Noyes Mountain stands within the watershed of the Little Androscoggin River, which drains into the Androscoggin River, and thence into Merrymeeting Bay in the Kennebec River estuary. The east and south sides of Noyes Mtn. drain into Pennesseewassee Lake, and thence into Pennesseewassee Stream and the Little Androscoggin River. The northeast side of Noyes Mtn. drains into Niles Brook, and the Little Androscoggin. The west side of Noyes Mtn. drains into Mud Pond, thence into Hicks Pond and Niles Brook.

== Tourist attractions ==
Noyes Mountain has many tourist attractions, including a canoe trip, the Snow Falls Gorge, the Paris Hill Village, a rock store, and a museum.
