= Signature of a knot =

Topological invariant in knot theory

The signature of a knot is a topological invariant in knot theory. It may be computed from the Seifert surface.

Given a knot K in the 3-sphere, it has a Seifert surface S whose boundary is K. The Seifert form of S is the pairing $\phi : H_1(S) \times H_1(S) \to \mathbb Z$ given by taking the linking number $\operatorname{lk}(a^+,b^-)$ where $a, b \in H_1(S)$ and $a^+, b^-$ indicate the translates of a and b respectively in the positive and negative directions of the normal bundle to S.

Given a basis $b_1,...,b_{2g}$ for $H_1(S)$ (where g is the genus of the surface) the Seifert form can be represented as a 2g-by-2g Seifert matrix V, $V_{ij}=\phi(b_i,b_j)$. The signature of the matrix $V+V^t$, thought of as a symmetric bilinear form, is the signature of the knot K.

Slice knots are known to have zero signature.

== The Alexander module formulation ==
Knot signatures can also be defined in terms of the Alexander module of the knot complement. Let $X$ be the universal abelian cover of the knot complement. Consider the Alexander module to be the first homology group of the universal abelian cover of the knot complement: $H_1(X;\mathbb Q)$. Given a $\mathbb Q[\mathbb Z]$-module $V$, let $\overline{V}$ denote the $\mathbb Q[\mathbb Z]$-module whose underlying $\mathbb Q$-module is $V$ but where $\mathbb Z$ acts by the inverse covering transformation. Blanchfield's formulation of Poincaré duality for $X$ gives a canonical isomorphism $H_1(X;\mathbb Q) \simeq \overline{H^2(X;\mathbb Q)}$ where $H^2(X;\mathbb Q)$ denotes the 2nd cohomology group of $X$ with compact supports and coefficients in $\mathbb Q$. The universal coefficient theorem for $H^2(X;\mathbb Q)$ gives a canonical isomorphism with $\operatorname{Ext}_{\mathbb Q[\mathbb Z]}(H_1(X;\mathbb Q),\mathbb Q[\mathbb Z])$ (because the Alexander module is $\mathbb Q[\mathbb Z]$-torsion). Moreover, just like in the quadratic form formulation of Poincaré duality, there is a canonical isomorphism of $\mathbb Q[\mathbb Z]$-modules $\operatorname{Ext}_{\mathbb Q[\mathbb Z]}(H_1(X;\mathbb Q),\mathbb Q[\mathbb Z]) \simeq \operatorname{Hom}_{\mathbb Q[\mathbb Z]}(H_1(X;\mathbb Q),[\mathbb Q[\mathbb Z]]/\mathbb Q[\mathbb Z] )$, where $[\mathbb Q[\mathbb Z]]$ denotes the field of fractions of $\mathbb Q[\mathbb Z]$. This isomorphism can be thought of as a sesquilinear duality pairing $H_1(X;\mathbb Q) \times H_1(X;\mathbb Q) \to [\mathbb Q[\mathbb Z]]/\mathbb Q[\mathbb Z]$ where $[\mathbb Q[\mathbb Z]]$ denotes the field of fractions of $\mathbb Q[\mathbb Z]$. This form takes value in the rational polynomials whose denominators are the Alexander polynomial of the knot, which as a $\mathbb Q[\mathbb Z]$-module is isomorphic to $\mathbb Q[\mathbb Z]/\Delta K$. Let $tr : \mathbb Q[\mathbb Z]/\Delta K \to \mathbb Q$ be any linear function which is invariant under the involution $t \longmapsto t^{-1}$, then composing it with the sesquilinear duality pairing gives a symmetric bilinear form on $H_1 (X;\mathbb Q)$ whose signature is an invariant of the knot.

All such signatures are concordance invariants, so all signatures of slice knots are zero. The sesquilinear duality pairing respects the prime-power decomposition of $H_1 (X;\mathbb Q)$—i.e.: the prime power decomposition gives an orthogonal decomposition of $H_1 (X;\mathbb R)$. Cherry Kearton has shown how to compute the Milnor signature invariants from this pairing, which are equivalent to the Tristram-Levine invariant.

== See also ==
- Link concordance
