= Link concordance =

Link equivalence relation weaker than isotopy but stronger than homotopy

In mathematics, two links $L_0 \subset S^n$ and $L_1 \subset S^n$ are concordant if there exists an embedding $f : L_0 \times [0,1] \to S^n \times [0,1]$ such that $f(L_0 \times \{0\}) = L_0 \times \{0\}$ and $f(L_0 \times \{1\}) = L_1 \times \{1\}$.

By its nature, link concordance is an equivalence relation. It is weaker than isotopy, and stronger than homotopy: isotopy implies concordance implies homotopy. A link is a slice link if it is concordant to the unlink.

== Concordance invariants ==
A function of a link that is invariant under concordance is called a concordance invariant.

The linking number of any two components of a link is one of the most elementary concordance invariants. The signature of a knot is also a concordance invariant. A subtler concordance invariant are the Milnor invariants, and in fact all rational finite type concordance invariants are Milnor invariants and their products, though non-finite type concordance invariants exist.

== Higher dimensions ==
One can analogously define concordance for any two submanifolds $M_0, M_1 \subset N$. In this case one considers two submanifolds concordant if there is a cobordism between them in $N \times [0,1],$ i.e., if there is a manifold with boundary $W \subset N \times [0,1]$ whose boundary consists of $M_0 \times \{0\}$ and $M_1 \times \{1\}.$

This higher-dimensional concordance is a relative form of cobordism – it requires two submanifolds to be not just abstractly cobordant, but "cobordant in N".

== See also ==
- Slice knot
