= Murasugi sum =

In knot theory, a Murasugi sum is a way of combining the Seifert surfaces of two knots or links, given with embeddings in space of each knot and of a Seifert surface for each knot, to produce another Seifert surface of another knot or link. It was introduced by Kunio Murasugi, who used it to compute the genus and Alexander polynomials of certain alternating knots. When the two given Seifert surfaces have the minimum genus for their knot, the same is true for their Murasugi sum. However, the genus of non-minimal-genus Seifert surfaces does not behave as predictably under Murasugi sums.
