= Greenwood, Maine =

Town in Maine, United States

- Town
- Location within Maine Location within the United States
- Coordinates: 44°20′12″N 70°40′26″W
- Country: United States
- State: Maine
- County: Oxford

Area
  - Total: 43.08 sq mi (111.58 km^{2})
  - Land: 41.67 sq mi (107.92 km^{2})
  - Water: 1.41 sq mi (3.65 km^{2})
- Elevation: 689 ft (210 m)

Population (2020)
  - Total: 774
  - Density: 19/sq mi (7.2/km^{2})
- Time zone: UTC-5 (Eastern (EST))
  - Summer (DST): UTC-4 (EDT)
- ZIP Codes: 04255 (Greenwood); 04217 (Bethel)
- Area code: 207
- FIPS code: 23-29710
- GNIS feature ID: 1987275
- Website: www.greenwoodmaine.org

Greenwood is a town in Oxford County, Maine, United States. The population was 774 at the 2020 census. The town was named for surveyor Alexander Greenwood. The village of Locke Mills, on State Route 26 in the northern part of Greenwood, is the town's urban center and largest settlement.

== Geography ==
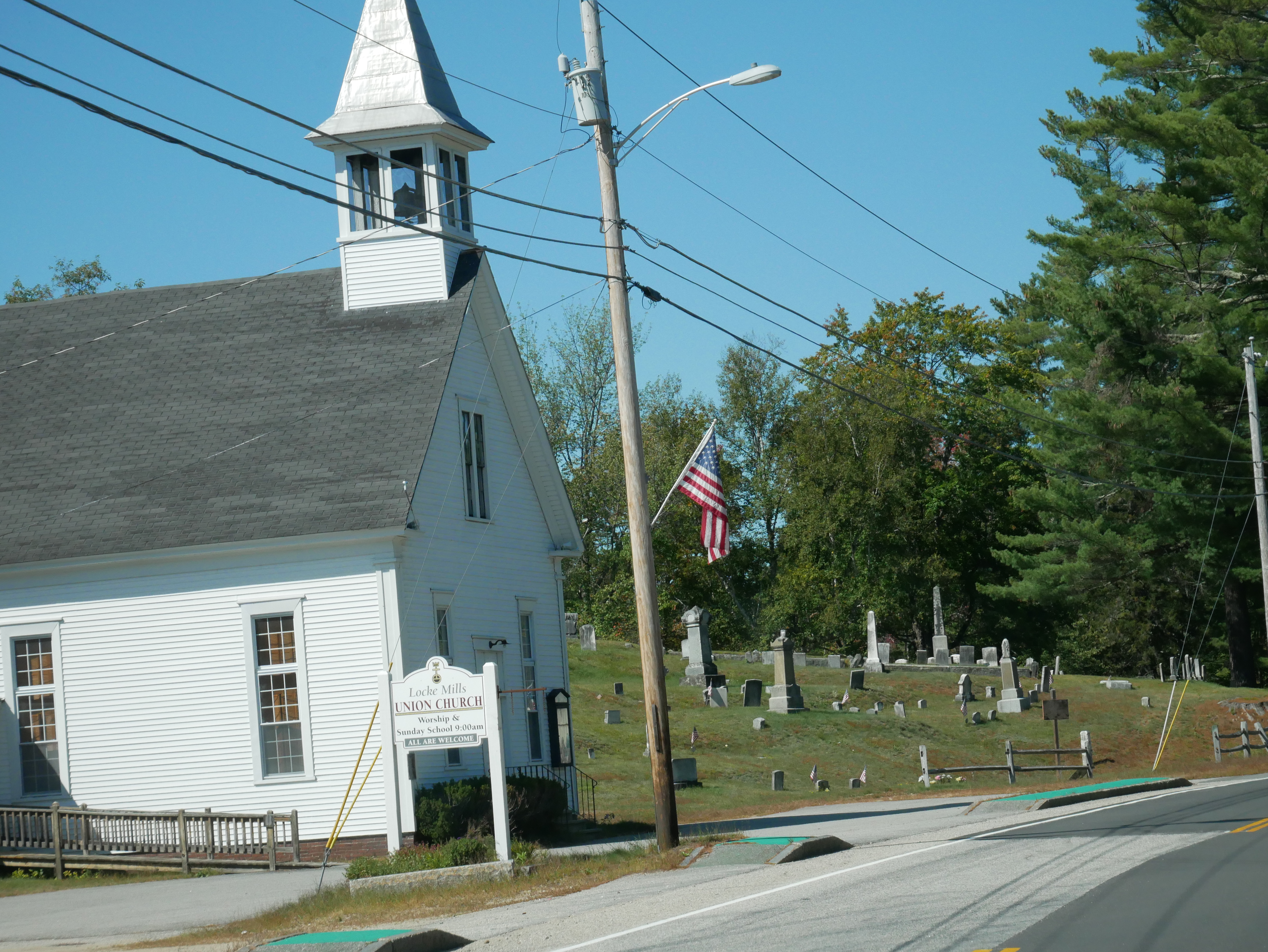
Locke Mills Union Church in Greenwood, ME.

According to the United States Census Bureau, the town has a total area of 43.08 square miles (111.58 km^{2}), of which 41.67 square miles (107.92 km^{2}) is land and 1.41 square miles (3.65 km^{2}) is water. Noyes Mountain features a short, steep climb to the summit with panoramic views. The Harvard Quarry at the summit is a popular destination for rock and mineral collectors. The town is the home of Mount Abram Ski Resort.

== Demographics ==
Historical population
Census	Pop.	Note	%±
1820	509		—
1830	695		36.5%
1840	836		20.3%
1850	1,118		33.7%
1860	878		−21.5%
1870	845		−3.8%
1880	838		−0.8%
1890	727		−13.2%
1900	741		1.9%
1910	664		−10.4%
1920	605		−8.9%
1930	548		−9.4%
1940	564		2.9%
1950	604		7.1%
1960	601		−0.5%
1970	610		1.5%
1980	653		7.0%
1990	689		5.5%
2000	802		16.4%
2010	830		3.5%
2020	774		−6.7%
U.S. Decennial Census

=== 2010 census ===
As of the census of 2010, there were 830 people, 362 households, and 232 families living in the town. The population density was 19.9 inhabitants per square mile (7.7/km^{2}). There were 810 housing units at an average density of 19.4 per square mile (7.5/km^{2}). The racial makeup of the town was 97.2% White, 0.4% African American, 0.5% Native American, 0.2% Asian, 0.7% from other races, and 1.0% from two or more races. Hispanic or Latino of any race were 1.7% of the population.

There were 362 households, of which 25.4% had children under the age of 18 living with them, 51.7% were married couples living together, 8.3% had a female householder with no husband present, 4.1% had a male householder with no wife present, and 35.9% were non-families. 28.2% of all households were made up of individuals, and 8.6% had someone living alone who was 65 years of age or older. The average household size was 2.29 and the average family size was 2.79.

The median age in the town was 46.3 years. 19.9% of residents were under the age of 18; 6.1% were between the ages of 18 and 24; 21% were from 25 to 44; 37.3% were from 45 to 64; and 15.7% were 65 years of age or older. The gender makeup of the town was 50.2% male and 49.8% female.

=== 2000 census ===
As of the census of 2000, there were 802 people, 320 households, and 226 families living in the town. The population density was 19.2 inhabitants per square mile (7.4/km^{2}). There were 670 housing units at an average density of 16.0 per square mile (6.2/km^{2}). The racial makeup of the town was 98.88% White, 0.12% African American, 0.37% Native American, 0.12% Asian, and 0.50% from two or more races. Hispanic or Latino of any race were 0.12% of the population.

There were 320 households, out of which 31.3% had children under the age of 18 living with them, 58.8% were married couples living together, 8.1% had a female householder with no husband present, and 29.1% were non-families. 20.6% of all households were made up of individuals, and 8.8% had someone living alone who was 65 years of age or older. The average household size was 2.51 and the average family size was 2.93.

In the town, the population was spread out, with 25.6% under the age of 18, 5.9% from 18 to 24, 27.1% from 25 to 44, 27.4% from 45 to 64, and 14.1% who were 65 years of age or older. The median age was 39 years. For every 100 females, there were 97.5 males. For every 100 females age 18 and over, there were 87.7 males.

The median income for a household in the town was $38,750, and the median income for a family was $41,458. Males had a median income of $34,554 versus $23,750 for females. The per capita income for the town was $22,143. About 4.3% of families and 7.3% of the population were below the poverty line, including 8.2% of those under age 18 and 3.3% of those age 65 or over.

== Notable people ==
- Leon Leonwood Bean, founder of L.L.Bean
- Nellie Verrill Mighels Davis, journalist
- Theodora Robinson Jenness (1847–1935), author, editor, missionary
- Les Otten, 2010 Maine Republican Gubernatorial Candidate and founder of American Skiing Company
- Lisa Piccirillo, Mathematician known for determining that the Conway knot is not a slice knot
- Addison Emery Verrill, Yale University professor of zoology, born in Greenwood in 1839
- Anna Willard, an Olympic athlete and U.S. national champion middle-distance runner
