= Conway knot =

Prime knot named for John Horton Conway

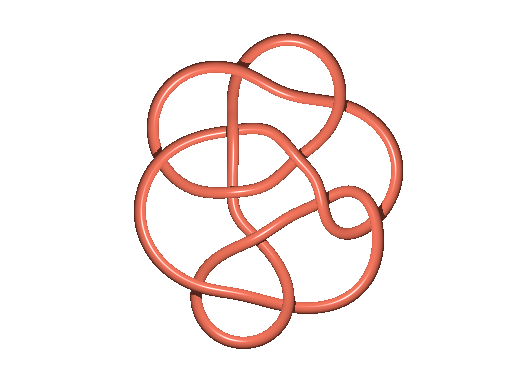
- Braid no.: 3
- Hyperbolic volume: 11.2191
- Conway notation: .−(3,2).2
- Thistlethwaite: 11n34

Other
- hyperbolic, prime, slice (topological only), chiral

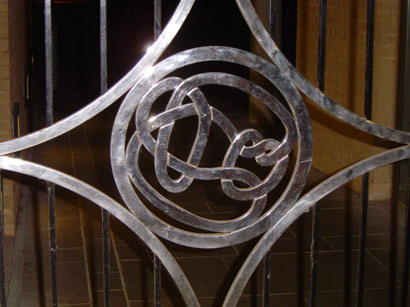
Conway knot emblem on a closed gate at Isaac Newton Institute

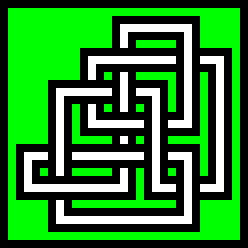
Conway knot

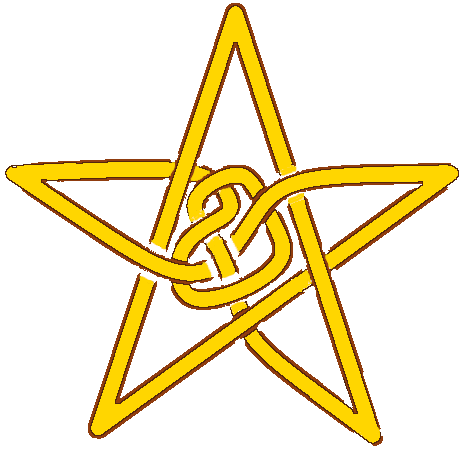
A five star version of the Conway knot

In mathematics, specifically in knot theory, the Conway knot (or Conway's knot) is a particular knot with 11 crossings, named after John Horton Conway.

It is related by mutation to the Kinoshita–Terasaka knot, with which it shares the same Jones polynomial. Both knots also have the property of having the same Alexander polynomial and Conway polynomial as the unknot.

The issue of the sliceness of the Conway knot was resolved in 2020 by Lisa Piccirillo, 50 years after Conway first proposed the knot. Her proof made use of Rasmussen's s-invariant, and showed that the knot is not a smoothly slice knot, though it is topologically slice (the Kinoshita–Terasaka knot is both).
