= Woodstock, Maine =

Town in Maine, United States

- Town
- Seal

- Location within Maine Location within the United States
- Coordinates: 44°22′29″N 70°36′25″W
- Country: United States
- State: Maine
- County: Oxford

Area
  - Total: 46.88 sq mi (121.42 km^{2})
  - Land: 45.70 sq mi (118.36 km^{2})
  - Water: 1.18 sq mi (3.06 km^{2})
- Elevation: 1,125 ft (343 m)

Population (2020)
  - Total: 1,352
  - Density: 30/sq mi (11.4/km^{2})
- Time zone: UTC-5 (Eastern (EST))
  - Summer (DST): UTC-4 (EDT)
- ZIP Code: 04219 (Bryant Pond)
- Area code: 207
- FIPS code: 23-87355
- GNIS feature ID: 582827
- Website: www.woodstockmaine.org

Woodstock is a town in Oxford County, Maine, United States. Woodstock is included in the Lewiston-Auburn, Maine metropolitan New England city and town area. The population was 1,352 at the 2020 census. The village of Bryant Pond, on State Route 26 in the northern part of Woodstock, is the town's urban center and largest settlement.

== History ==
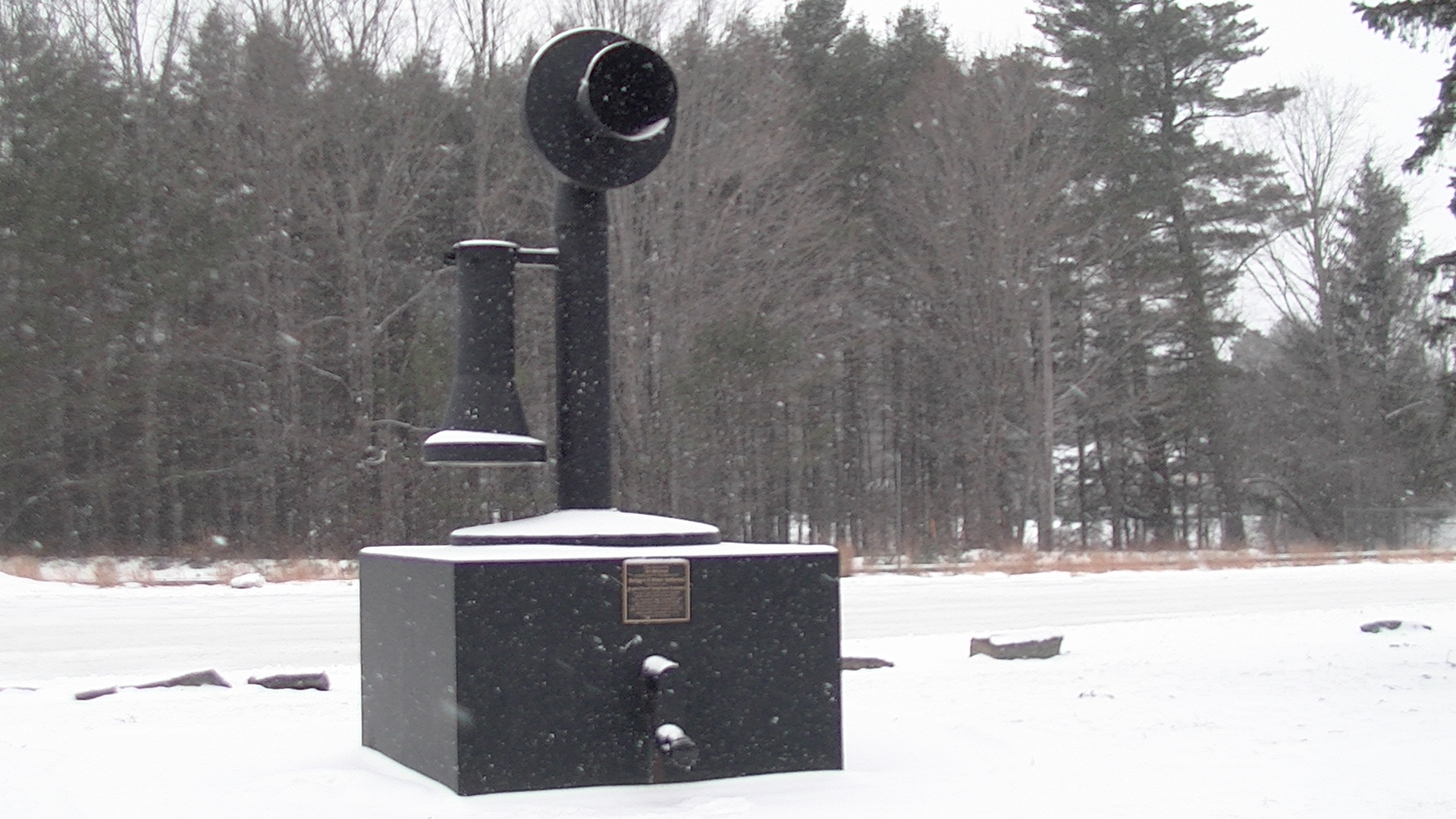
Monument in town commemorating that Woodstock, Maine was the last location still using the crank telephone system until 1983.

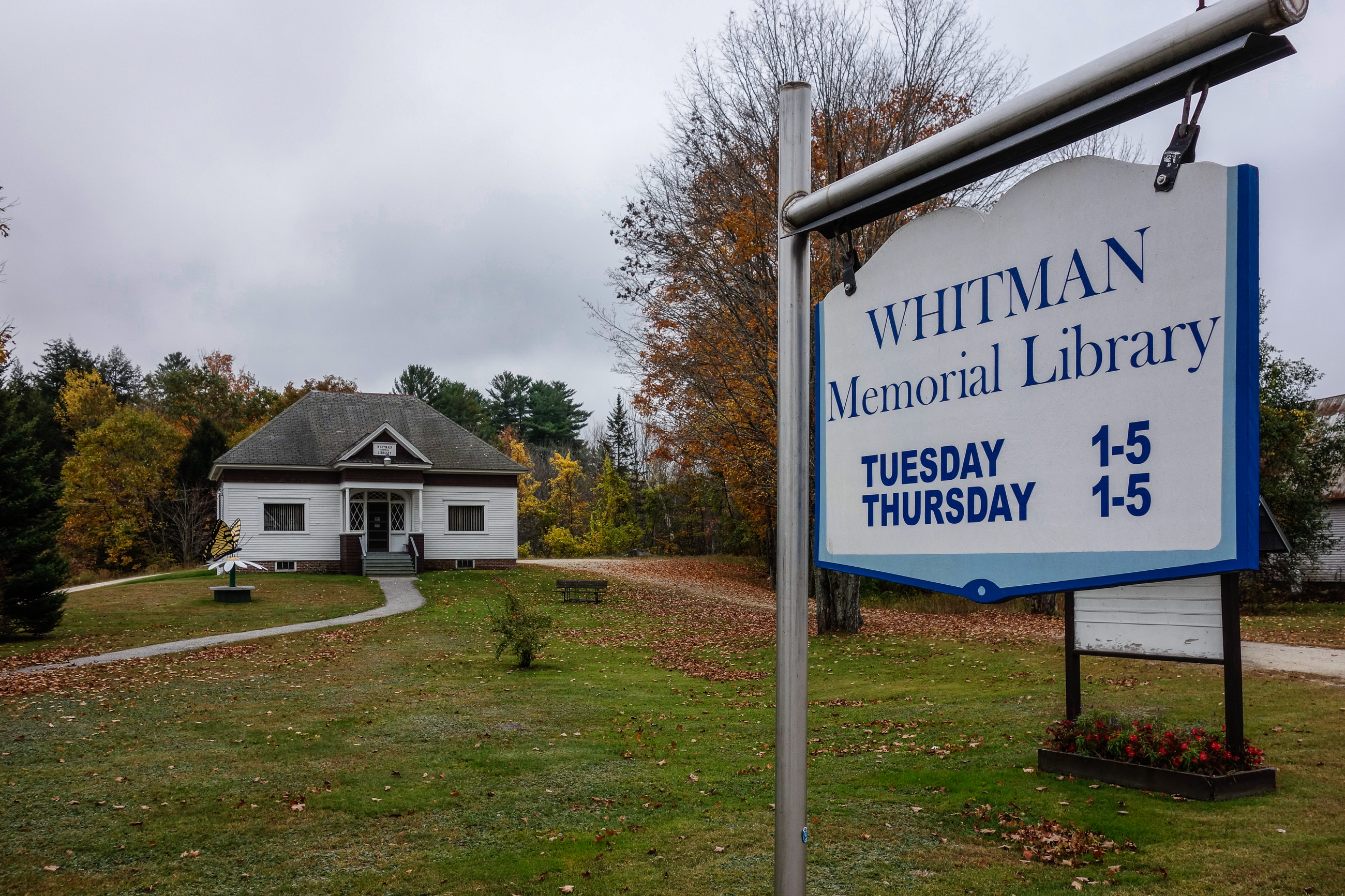
Whitman Memorial Library in Woodstock, Maine

Woodstock was first settled in about 1808 as Plantation Number Three. In 1814, a petition was sent to the Massachusetts General Court of Boston that requested the plantation be incorporated into a town called Sparta. Massachusetts Governor Caleb Strong approved the petition on February 7, 1815, to establish the town of Woodstock. It is unclear why the name Woodstock was chosen.

The village of Bryant Pond is believed to be the last telephone exchange in the U.S. to convert from operator-based hand-crank service to direct-dial service. The conversion occurred on October 11, 1983.

== Geography ==
The area within the town limits of Woodstock is forested and mountainous. The town includes most of Lake Christopher (Bryant Pond). According to the United States Census Bureau, the town has a total area of 46.88 square miles (121.42 km^{2}), of which 45.70 square miles (118.36 km^{2}) is land and 1.18 square miles (3.06 km^{2}) is water.

=== Adjacent municipalities ===
- Milton (north)
- Peru (northeast)
- Sumner (east)
- West Paris (southeast)
- Greenwood (west)
- Bethel (northwest)

== Demographics ==
Historical population
Census	Pop.	Note	%±
1820	392		—
1830	573		46.2%
1840	819		42.9%
1850	1,012		23.6%
1860	1,025		1.3%
1870	994		−3.0%
1880	952		−4.2%
1890	859		−9.8%
1900	816		−5.0%
1910	808		−1.0%
1920	765		−5.3%
1930	848		10.8%
1940	913		7.7%
1950	971		6.4%
1960	930		−4.2%
1970	1,005		8.1%
1980	1,087		8.2%
1990	1,194		9.8%
2000	1,307		9.5%
2010	1,277		−2.3%
2020	1,352		5.9%
U.S. Decennial Census

=== 2010 census ===
As of the census of 2010, there were 1,277 people, 546 households, and 377 families living in the town. The population density was 27.9 inhabitants per square mile (10.8/km^{2}). There were 974 housing units at an average density of 21.3 per square mile (8.2/km^{2}). The racial makeup of the town was 98.4% White, 0.1% African American, 0.4% Native American, 0.1% Asian, and 1.0% from two or more races. Hispanic or Latino of any race were 0.4% of the population.

There were 546 households, of which 27.1% had children under the age of 18 living with them, 55.1% were married couples living together, 7.7% had a female householder with no husband present, 6.2% had a male householder with no wife present, and 31.0% were non-families. 24.4% of all households were made up of individuals, and 11.6% had someone living alone who was 65 years of age or older. The average household size was 2.34 and the average family size was 2.71.

The median age in the town was 46.2 years. 19.1% of residents were under the age of 18; 5.5% were between the ages of 18 and 24; 23.2% were from 25 to 44; 33.6% were from 45 to 64; and 18.5% were 65 years of age or older. The gender makeup of the town was 50.0% male and 50.0% female.

=== 2000 census ===
As of the census of 2000, there were 1,307 people, 525 households, and 371 families living in the town. The population density was 28.6 inhabitants per square mile (11.0/km^{2}). There were 842 housing units at an average density of 18.4 per square mile (7.1/km^{2}). The racial makeup of the town was 98.85% White, 0.15% Native American, 0.08% Asian, and 0.92% from two or more races. Hispanic or Latino of any race were 0.54% of the population.

There were 525 households, out of which 30.1% had children under the age of 18 living with them, 59.0% were married couples living together, 7.6% had a female householder with no husband present, and 29.3% were non-families. 23.8% of all households were made up of individuals, and 7.4% had someone living alone who was 65 years of age or older. The average household size was 2.47 and the average family size was 2.89.

In the town, the population was spread out, with 24.6% under the age of 18, 5.9% from 18 to 24, 28.0% from 25 to 44, 26.2% from 45 to 64, and 15.2% who were 65 years of age or older. The median age was 40 years. For every 100 females, there were 106.8 males. For every 100 females age 18 and over, there were 99.0 males.

The median income for a household in the town was $35,642, and the median income for a family was $38,750. Males had a median income of $28,889 versus $22,273 for females. The per capita income for the town was $16,698. About 5.5% of families and 9.3% of the population were below the poverty line, including 14.3% of those under age 18 and 5.9% of those age 65 or over.

== Education ==
Woodstock is in the "Oxford Unorganized Territory" school district.

== Notable people ==
- Tucker Carlson - political commentator

== See also ==
- Lake Christopher (Bryant Pond)
- Western Maine Mountains
