= Slice knot =

Knot that bounds an embedded disk in 4-space

A smooth slice disk in Morse position, showing minima, saddles and a maximum, and as an illustration a movie for the Kinoshita–Terasaka knot

A slice knot is a mathematical knot in 3-dimensional space that bounds an embedded disk in 4-dimensional space.

== Definition ==
A knot $K \subset S^3$ is said to be a topologically slice knot or a smoothly slice knot, if it is the boundary of an embedded disk in the 4-ball $B^4$, which is locally flat or smooth, respectively. Here we use $S^3 = \partial B^4$: the 3-sphere $S^3 = \{\mathbf{x} \in \mathbb{R}^4 : |\mathbf{x}| = 1\}$ is the boundary of the four-dimensional ball $B^4 = \{\mathbf{x} \in \mathbb{R}^4 : |\mathbf{x}| \leq 1 \}.$ Every smoothly slice knot is topologically slice because a smoothly embedded disk is locally flat. Usually, smoothly slice knots are also just called slice. Both types of slice knots are important in 3- and 4-dimensional topology.

Smoothly slice knots are often illustrated using knots diagrams of ribbon knots and it is an open question whether there are any smoothly slice knots which are not ribbon knots (′Slice-ribbon conjecture′).

=== Cone construction ===
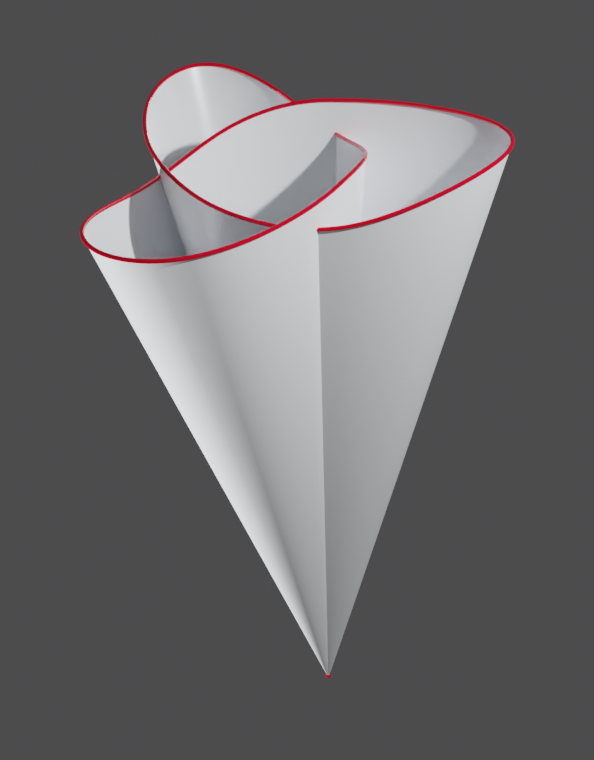
Cone over the trefoil knot

The conditions locally-flat or smooth are essential in the definition: For every knot we can construct the cone over the knot which is a disk in the 4-ball with the required property with the exception that it is not locally-flat or smooth at the singularity (it works for the trivial knot, though).

Note, that the disk in the illustration on the right does not have self-intersections in 4-space. These only occur in the projection to three-dimensional space. Therefore, the disk is ′correctly′ embedded at every point but not at the singularity (it is not locally-flat there).

=== Slice knots and the knot concordance group ===
Two oriented knots $K_1, K_2$ are said to be concordant, if the connected sum $K_1 \sharp -K_2$ is slice. In the same way as before, we distinguish topologically and smoothly concordant. With $-K_2$ we denote the mirror image of $K_2$ where in addition the orientation is reversed. The relationship ′concordant′ is reflexive because $K \sharp -K$ is slice for every knot $K$. It is also possible to show that it is transitive: if $K_1$ is concordant to $K_2$ and $K_2$ is concordant to $K_3$ then $K_1$ is concordant to $K_3$. Since the relation is also symmetric, it is an equivalence relation. The equivalence classes together with the connected sum of knots as operation then form an abelian group which is called the (topological or smooth) knot concordance group. The neutral element in this group is the set of slice knots (topological or smooth, respectively).

== Examples ==
Using the trefoil knot we illustrate the reflexivity of the concordance relation: every knot is concordant to itself. In the definition of concordance two reversions of orientations occur: The knot orientation is reversed (green and red arrow) and also the orientation of 3-space. The effect of the latter is the knot's mirroring.

Every ribbon knot is a smoothly slice knot because—with the exception of the ribbon singularities—the knot already bounds an embedded disk (in 3-space). The ribbon singularities may be deformed in a small neighbourhood into 4-space so that the disk is embedded.

There are 21 non-trivial slice prime knots with crossing number $cr(K)\le 10$. These are $6_1$, $8_8$, $8_9$, $8_{20}$, $9_{27}$, $9_{41}$, $9_{46}$, $10_3$, $10_{22}$, $10_{35}$, $10_{42}$, $10_{48}$, $10_{75}$, $10_{87}$, $10_{99}$, $10_{123}$, $10_{129}$, $10_{137}$, $10_{140}$, $10_{153}$ and $10_{155}$. Up to this crossing number there are no topologically slice knots which are not smoothly slice. Starting with crossing number 11 there is such an example, however: The Conway knot (named after John Horton Conway) is a topologically but not smoothly slice knot. On the other hand, the Kinoshita-Terasaka knot, a so-called ′mutant′ of the Conway knot, is smoothly slice. Twist knots are, except for the trivial knot and the Stevedore knot $6_1$, not slice. All topologically and smoothly slice knots with crossing number $cr(K)\le 12$ are known. Composite slice knots up to crossing number 12 are, besides those of the form $K \sharp -K$ and $6_1 \sharp 3_1 \sharp -3_1$, the two more interesting knots $3_1 \sharp 8_{10}$ and $3_1 \sharp 8_{11}$.

== Invariants ==
The following properties are valid for topologically and smoothly slice knots: The Alexander polynomial of a slice knot can be written as $\Delta(t)=f(t)f(t^{-1})$ with a Laurent polynomial $f$ with integer coefficients (Fox-Milnor condition). It follows that the knot's determinant ($=\Delta(-1)$) is a square number.

The signature is an invariant of concordance classes and the signature of slice knots is zero. Furthermore, the signature map is a homomorphism from concordance group to the integers: The signature of the sum of two concordance classes is the sum of the two signatures.

- It follows that the concordance group contains elements of infinite order: The signature of a trefoil knot is ±2 and the signature of the concordance class of the connected sum of $n$ trefoils is $\pm 2n$ and therefore not 0.
- The concordance group also contains elements of order 2: The figure-eight knot $4_1$ is amphicheiral and invertible, and therefore we have $4_1 = -4_1$. In the concordance group we find $4_1 \sharp 4_1 = 4_1 \sharp -4_1 = 0$. Since the determinant of the figure-eight knot is 5, which is not a square number, this knot is not slice and it follows that its order in the concordance group is 2. Of course, knots with a finite order in the concordance group always have signature 0.

For both variants of the concordance group it is unknown whether elements of finite order $> 2$ exist.

On the other hand, invariants with different properties for the two concordance variants exist: Knots with trivial Alexander polynomial ($\Delta(t)=1$) are always topologically slice, but not necessarily smoothly slice (the Conway knot is an example for that). Rasmussen's s-invariant vanishes for smoothly slice, but in general not for topologically slice knots.

== Geometrical description of the concordance relation ==
Top: The composition of two knot concordances shows the transitivity in a geometric way. Bottom: A concordance of genus 1 between two knots. If the knot on the left is trivial then the knot on the right has a smooth 4-genus of 0 or 1 — it is the boundary of an embedded surface of genus 1 but could also bound a disk.

As an alternative to the above definition of concordance using slice knots there is also a second equivalent definition. Two oriented knots $K_1$ and $K_2$ are concordant if they are the boundary of a (locally flat or smooth) cylinder $C = S^1 \times [0,1]$ (in the 4-dimensional space $S^3 \times [0,1]$). The orientations of the two knots have to be consistent to the cylinder's orientation, which is illustrated in the third figure. The boundary of $S^3 \times [0,1]$ are two $S^3$ with different orientations and therefore two mirrored trefoils are shown as boundary of the cylinder. Connecting the two knots by cutting out a strip from the cylinder yields a disk, showing that for all knots the connected sum $K \sharp -K$ is slice. In both definitions a knot is slice if and only if it is concordant to the trivial knot.

This can be illustrated also with the first figure at the top of this article: If a small disk at the local minimum on the bottom left is cut out then the boundary of the surface at this place is a trivial knot and the surface is a cylinder. At the other end of the cylinder we have a slice knot. If the disk (or cylinder) is smoothly embedded it can be slightly deformed to a so-called Morse position.

This is useful because the critical points with respect to the radial function r carry geometrical meaning. At saddle points, trivial components are added or destroyed (band moves, also called fusion and fission). For slice knots any number of these band moves are possible, whereas for ribbon knots only fusions may occur and fissions are not allowed.

In the illustration on the right the geometrical description of the concordance is rotated by 90° and the parameter r is renamed to t. This name fits well to a time interpretation of a surface ′movie′.

== 4-genus ==
An analogous definition as for slice knots may be done with surfaces of larger genus. The 4-genus (also called ′slice genus′) of a knot is therefore defined as the smallest genus of an embedded surface in 4-space of which the knot is the boundary. As before, we distinguish the topological and smooth 4-genus. Knots with 4-genus 0 are slice knots because a disk, the simplest surface, has genus 0. The 4-genus is always smaller or equal to the knot's genus because this invariant is defined using Seifert surfaces which are embedded already in three-dimensional space.

Examples for knots with different values for their topological and smooth 4-genus are listed in the following table. The Conway knot 11n34 is, as already mentioned, the first example in the knot tables for a topologically but not smoothly slice knot. Judging from the values in the table we could conclude that the smooth and the topological 4-genus always differ by 1, when they are not equal. This is not the case, however, and the difference can be arbitrarily large. It is not known, though, (as of 2017), whether there are alternating knots with a difference > 1.

| | $10_{139}$ | $10_{145}$ | $10_{152}$ | $10_{154}$ | $10_{161}$ | $11n34$ |
|---|---|---|---|---|---|---|
| 4-genus (smooth) | 4 | 2 | 4 | 3 | 3 | 1 |
| 4-genus (top.) | 3 | 1 | 3 | 2 | 2 | 0 |

== Bibliography ==
- Dale Rolfsen: Knots and Links, Publish or Perish, 1976, Chapter 8.E
- Charles Livingston: Knot theory, Carus Mathematical Monographs, 1993
- Charles Livingston: A Survey of Classical Knot Concordance, Chapter 7 in „Handbook of Knot Theory“, Elsevier, 2005

== See also ==
- Link concordance – Link equivalence relation weaker than isotopy but stronger than homotopy
