= Borromean rings =

Three linked but pairwise separated rings

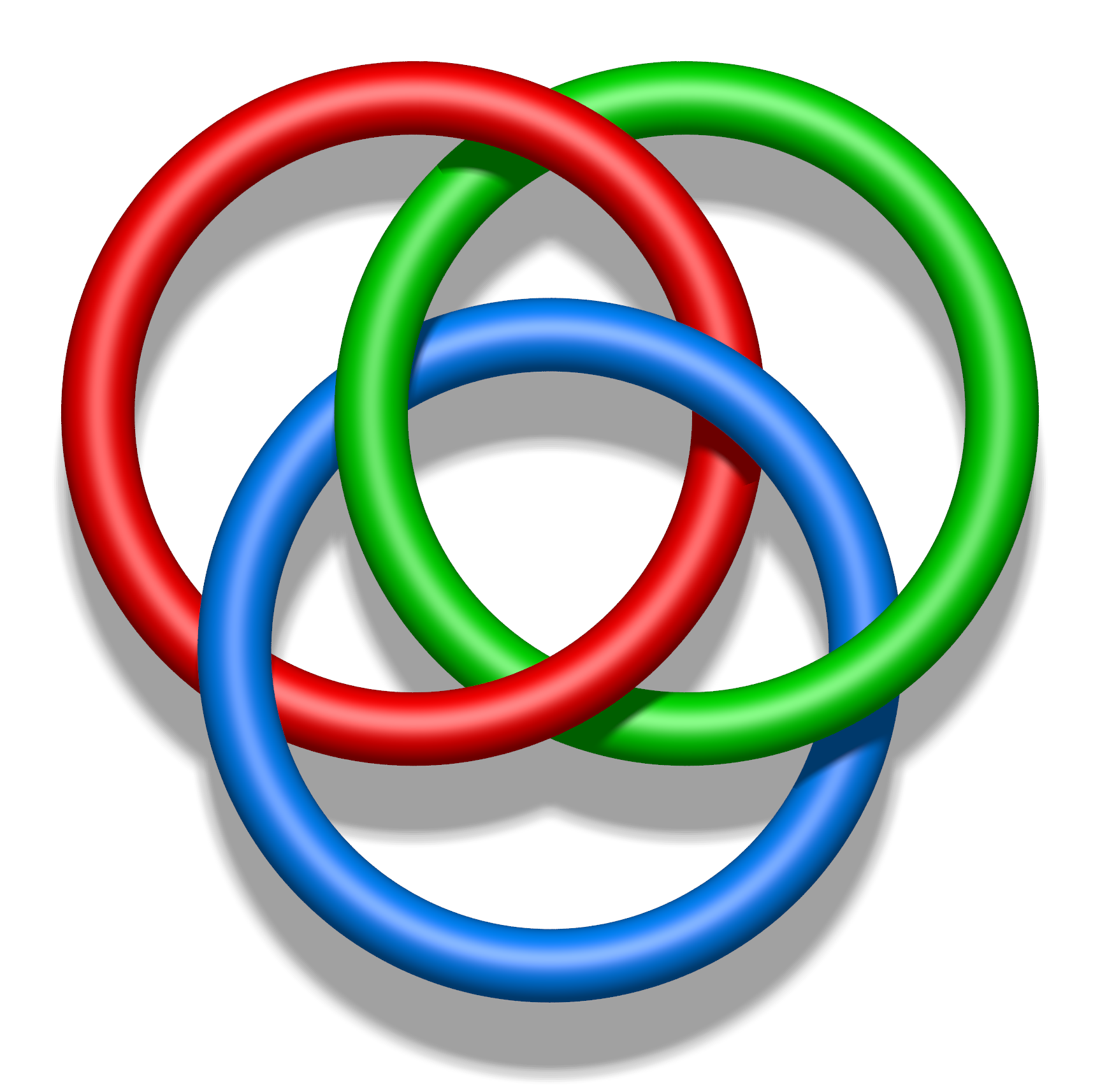
- L6a4
- Crossing no.: 6
- Hyperbolic volume: 7.327724753
- Stick no.: 9
- Conway notation: .1
- A–B notation: 6^{3}_{2}
- Thistlethwaite: L6a4

Other
- alternating, hyperbolic

In mathematics, the Borromean rings (Note: Pronounced /bɒroʊˈmiːən/) are three simple closed curves in three-dimensional space that are topologically linked and cannot be separated from each other, but that break apart into two unknotted and unlinked loops when any one of the three is cut or removed. Most commonly, these rings are drawn as three circles in the plane, in the pattern of a Venn diagram, alternatingly crossing over and under each other at the points where they cross. Other triples of curves are said to form the Borromean rings as long as they are topologically equivalent to the curves depicted in this drawing.

The Borromean rings are named after the Italian House of Borromeo, who used the circular form of these rings as an element of their coat of arms, but designs based on the Borromean rings have been used in many cultures, including by the Norsemen and in Japan. They have been used in Christian symbolism as a sign of the Trinity, and in modern commerce as the logo of Ballantine beer, giving them the alternative name Ballantine rings. Physical instances of the Borromean rings have been made from linked DNA or other molecules, and they have analogues in the Efimov state and Borromean nuclei, both of which have three components bound to each other although no two of them are bound.

Geometrically, the Borromean rings may be realized by linked ellipses, or (using the vertices of a regular icosahedron) by linked golden rectangles. It is impossible to realize them using circles in three-dimensional space, but it has been conjectured that they may be realized by copies of any non-circular simple closed curve in space. In knot theory, the Borromean rings can be proved to be linked by counting their Fox n-colorings. As links, they are Brunnian, alternating, algebraic, and hyperbolic. In arithmetic topology, certain triples of prime numbers have analogous linking properties to the Borromean rings.

== Definition and notation ==
It is common in mathematics publications that define the Borromean rings to do so as a link diagram, a drawing of curves in the plane with crossings marked to indicate which curve or part of a curve passes above or below at each crossing. Such a drawing can be transformed into a system of curves in three-dimensional space by embedding the plane into space and deforming the curves drawn on it above or below the embedded plane at each crossing, as indicated in the diagram. The commonly used diagram for the Borromean rings consists of three equal circles centered at the points of an equilateral triangle, close enough together that their interiors have a common intersection (such as in a Venn diagram or the three circles used to define the Reuleaux triangle). Its crossings alternate between above and below when considered in consecutive order around each circle; another equivalent way to describe the over-under relation between the three circles is that each circle passes over a second circle at both of their crossings, and under the third circle at both of their crossings. Two links are said to be equivalent if there is a continuous deformation of space (an ambient isotopy) taking one to another, and the Borromean rings may refer to any link that is equivalent in this sense to the standard diagram for this link.

In The Knot Atlas, the Borromean rings are denoted with the code "L6a4"; the notation means that this is a link with six crossings and an alternating diagram, the fourth of five alternating 6-crossing links identified by Morwen Thistlethwaite in a list of all prime links with up to 13 crossings. In the tables of knots and links in Dale Rolfsen's 1976 book Knots and Links, extending earlier listings in the 1920s by Alexander and Briggs, the Borromean rings were given the Alexander–Briggs notation "6^{3}_{2}", meaning that this is the second of three 6-crossing 3-component links to be listed. The Conway notation for the Borromean rings, ".1", is an abbreviated description of the standard link diagram for this link.

== History and symbolism ==
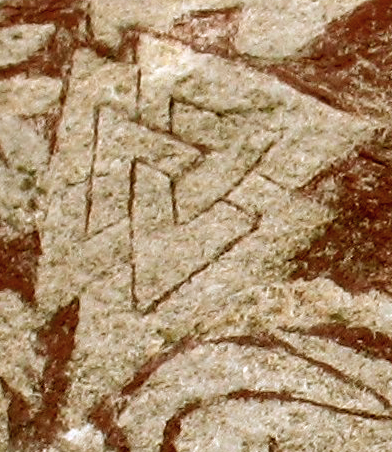
Valknut on Stora Hammars I stone

Symbol of the Christian Trinity, adapted from a 13th-century manuscript

Linked triangles in the Marundeeswarar Temple

The name "Borromean rings" comes from the use of these rings, in the form of three linked circles, in the coat of arms of the aristocratic Borromeo family in Northern Italy. The link itself is much older and has appeared in the form of the valknut, three linked equilateral triangles with parallel sides, on Norse image stones dating back to the 7th century. The Ōmiwa Shrine in Japan is also decorated with a motif of the Borromean rings, in their conventional circular form. A stone pillar in the 6th-century Marundeeswarar Temple in India shows three equilateral triangles rotated from each other to form a regular enneagram; like the Borromean rings these three triangles are linked and not pairwise linked, but this crossing pattern describes a different link than the Borromean rings.

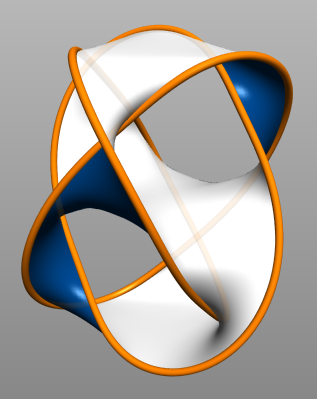
A Seifert surface of the Borromean rings

The Borromean rings have been used in different contexts to indicate strength in unity. In particular, some have used the design to symbolize the Trinity. A 13th-century French manuscript depicting the Borromean rings labeled as unity in trinity was lost in a fire in the 1940s, but reproduced in an 1843 book by Adolphe Napoléon Didron. Didron and others have speculated that the description of the Trinity as three equal circles in canto 33 of Dante's Paradiso was inspired by similar images, although Dante does not detail the geometric arrangement of these circles. The psychoanalyst Jacques Lacan found inspiration in the Borromean rings as a model for his topology of human subjectivity, with each ring representing a fundamental Lacanian component of reality (the "real", the "imaginary", and the "symbolic").

The rings were used as the logo of Ballantine beer, and are still used by the Ballantine brand beer, now distributed by the current brand owner, the Pabst Brewing Company. For this reason they have sometimes been called the "Ballantine rings".

The first work of knot theory to include the Borromean rings was a catalog of knots and links compiled in 1876 by Peter Tait. In recreational mathematics, the Borromean rings were popularized by Martin Gardner, who featured Seifert surfaces for the Borromean rings in his September 1961 "Mathematical Games" column in Scientific American. In 2006, the International Mathematical Union decided at the 25th International Congress of Mathematicians in Madrid, Spain to use a new logo based on the Borromean rings.

=== Partial and multiple rings ===
In medieval and renaissance Europe, a number of visual signs consist of three elements interlaced together in the same way that the Borromean rings are shown interlaced (in their conventional two-dimensional depiction), but with individual elements that are not closed loops. Examples of such symbols are the Snoldelev stone horns and the Diana of Poitiers crescents.

Some knot-theoretic links contain multiple Borromean rings configurations; one five-loop link of this type is used as a symbol in Discordianism, based on a depiction in the Principia Discordia.

== Mathematical properties ==
=== Linkedness ===
Algebraic link diagram for the Borromean rings. The vertical dotted black midline is a Conway sphere separating the diagram into 2-tangles.

In knot theory, the Borromean rings are a simple example of a Brunnian link, a link that cannot be separated but that falls apart into separate unknotted loops as soon as any one of its components is removed. There are infinitely many Brunnian links, and infinitely many three-curve Brunnian links, of which the Borromean rings are the simplest.

There are a number of ways of seeing that the Borromean rings are linked. One is to use Fox n-colorings, colorings of the arcs of a link diagram with the integers modulo n so that at each crossing, the two colors at the undercrossing have the same average (modulo n) as the color of the overcrossing arc, and so that at least two colors are used. The number of colorings meeting these conditions is a knot invariant, independent of the diagram chosen for the link. A trivial link with three components has $n^3-n$ colorings, obtained from its standard diagram by choosing a color independently for each component and discarding the $n$ colorings that only use one color. For standard diagram of the Borromean rings, on the other hand, the same pairs of arcs meet at two undercrossings, forcing the arcs that cross over them to have the same color as each other, from which it follows that the only colorings that meet the crossing conditions violate the condition of using more than one color. Because the trivial link has many valid colorings and the Borromean rings have none, they cannot be equivalent.

The Borromean rings are an alternating link, as their conventional link diagram has crossings that alternate between passing over and under each curve, in order along the curve. They are also an algebraic link, a link that can be decomposed by Conway spheres into 2-tangles. They are the simplest alternating algebraic link which does not have a diagram that is simultaneously alternating and algebraic. It follows from the Tait conjectures that the crossing number of the Borromean rings (the fewest crossings in any of their link diagrams) is 6, the number of crossings in their alternating diagram.

=== Ring shape ===
One possible 3D arrangement of Borromean rings: if they are circular when viewed from above, then they need to curve outside of a single plane.

The Borromean rings are typically drawn with their rings projecting to circles in the plane of the drawing, but three-dimensional circular Borromean rings are an impossible object: it is not possible to form the Borromean rings from circles in three-dimensional space.

More generally Michael H. Freedman and Richard Skora (1987) proved using four-dimensional hyperbolic geometry that no Brunnian link can be exactly circular. For three rings in their conventional Borromean arrangement, this can be seen from considering the link diagram. If one assumes that two of the circles touch at their two crossing points, then they lie in either a plane or a sphere. In either case, the third circle must pass through this plane or sphere four times, without lying in it, which is impossible. Another argument for the impossibility of circular realizations, by Helge Tverberg, uses inversive geometry to transform any three circles so that one of them becomes a line, making it easier to argue that the other two circles do not link with it to form the Borromean rings.

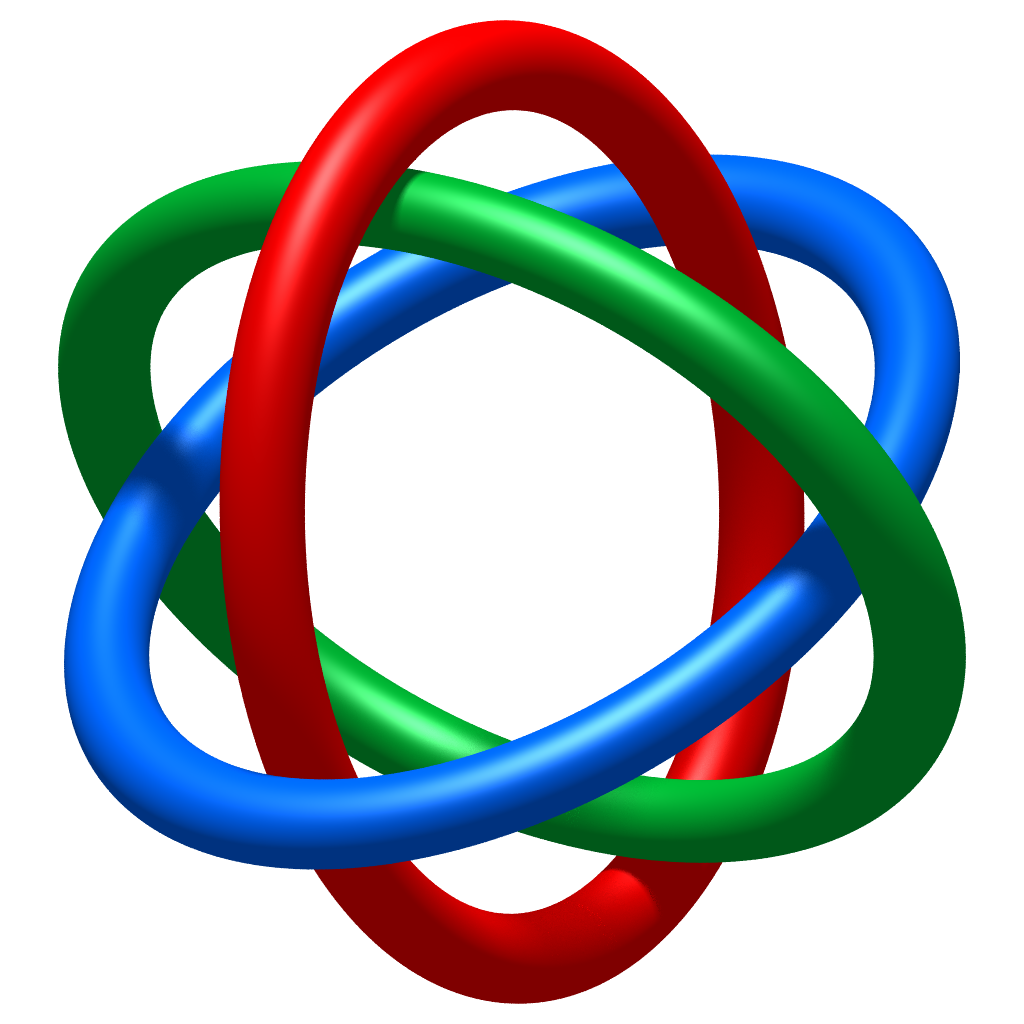
Realization of Borromean rings using ellipses

Three linked golden rectangles in a regular icosahedron

However, the Borromean rings can be realized using ellipses. These may be taken to be of arbitrarily small eccentricity: no matter how close to being circular their shape may be, as long as they are not perfectly circular, they can form Borromean links if suitably positioned. A realization of the Borromean rings by three mutually perpendicular golden rectangles can be found within a regular icosahedron by connecting three opposite pairs of its edges. Every three unknotted polygons in Euclidean space may be combined, after a suitable scaling transformation, to form the Borromean rings. If all three polygons are planar, then scaling is not needed. In particular, because the Borromean rings can be realized by three triangles, the minimum number of sides possible for each of its loops, the stick number of the Borromean rings is nine.

Unsolved problem in mathematics
Are there three unknotted curves, not all circles, that cannot form the Borromean rings?
More unsolved problems in mathematics

More generally, Matthew Cook has conjectured that any three unknotted simple closed curves in space, not all circles, can be combined without scaling to form the Borromean rings. After Jason Cantarella suggested a possible counterexample, Hugh Nelson Howards weakened the conjecture to apply to any three planar curves that are not all circles. On the other hand, although there are infinitely many Brunnian links with three links, the Borromean rings are the only one that can be formed from three convex curves.

=== Ropelength ===
Logo of the International Mathematical Union

In knot theory, the ropelength of a knot or link is the shortest length of flexible rope (of radius one) that can realize it. Mathematically, such a realization can be described by a smooth curve whose radius-one tubular neighborhood avoids self-intersections. The minimum ropelength of the Borromean rings has not been proven, but the smallest value that has been attained is realized by three copies of a 2-lobed planar curve. Although it resembles an earlier candidate for minimum ropelength, constructed from four circular arcs of radius two, it is slightly modified from that shape, and is composed from 42 smooth pieces defined by elliptic integrals, making it shorter by a fraction of a percent than the piecewise-circular realization. It is this realization, conjectured to minimize ropelength, that was used for the International Mathematical Union logo. Its length is $\approx 58.006$, while the best proven lower bound on the length is $12\pi\approx 37.699$.

For a discrete analogue of ropelength, the shortest representation using only edges of the integer lattice, the minimum length for the Borromean rings is exactly $36$. This is the length of a representation using three $2\times 4$ integer rectangles, inscribed in Jessen's icosahedron in the same way that the representation by golden rectangles is inscribed in the regular icosahedron.

=== Hyperbolic geometry ===
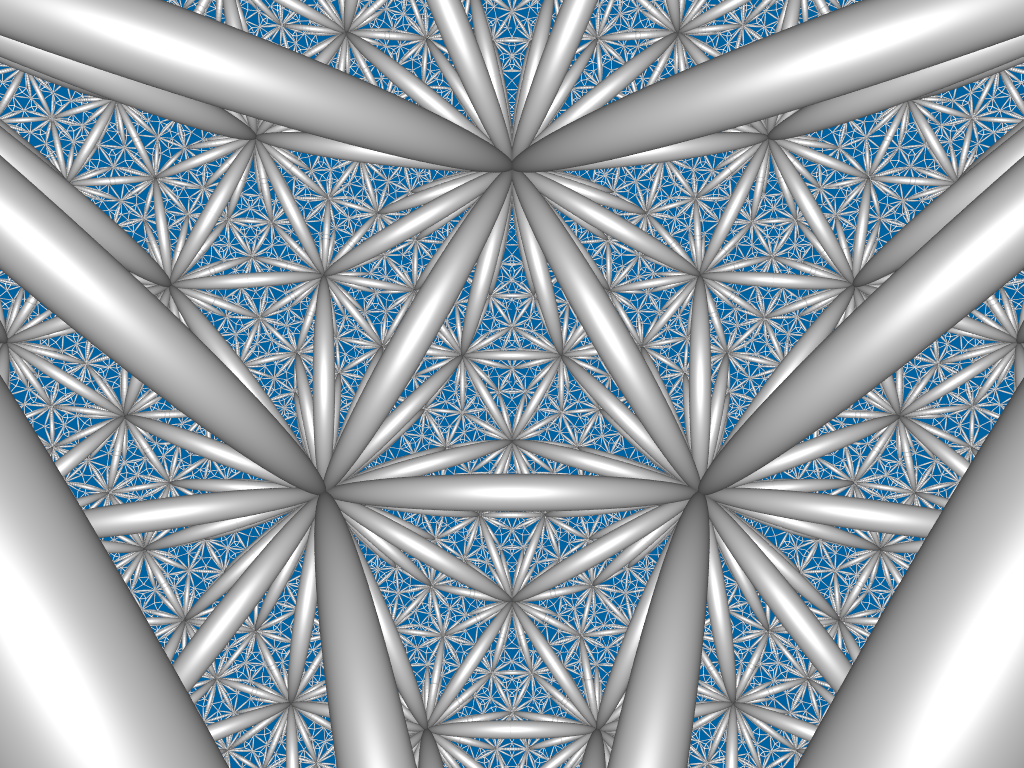
The complement of the Borromean rings, a hyperbolic manifold formed from two ideal octahedra, seen repeatedly in this view. The rings are infinitely far away, at the octahedron vertices.

The Borromean rings are a hyperbolic link: the space surrounding the Borromean rings (their link complement) admits a complete hyperbolic metric of finite volume. Although hyperbolic links are now considered plentiful, the Borromean rings were one of the earliest examples to be proved hyperbolic, in the 1970s, and this link complement was a central example in the video Not Knot, produced in 1991 by the Geometry Center.

Hyperbolic manifolds can be decomposed in a canonical way into gluings of hyperbolic polyhedra (the Epstein–Penner decomposition) and for the Borromean complement this decomposition consists of two ideal regular octahedra. The volume of the Borromean complement is $16\Lambda(\pi/4)=8G \approx 7.32772\dots$ where $\Lambda$ is the Lobachevsky function and $G$ is Catalan's constant. The complement of the Borromean rings is universal, in the sense that every closed 3-manifold is a branched cover over this space.

=== Number theory ===
In arithmetic topology, there is an analogy between knots and prime numbers in which one considers links between primes. The triple of primes (13, 61, 937) are linked modulo 2 (the Rédei symbol is −1) but are pairwise unlinked modulo 2 (the Legendre symbols are all 1). Therefore, these primes have been called a "proper Borromean triple modulo 2" or "mod 2 Borromean primes".

== Physical realizations ==
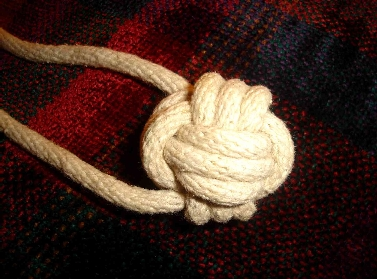
A monkey's fist knot

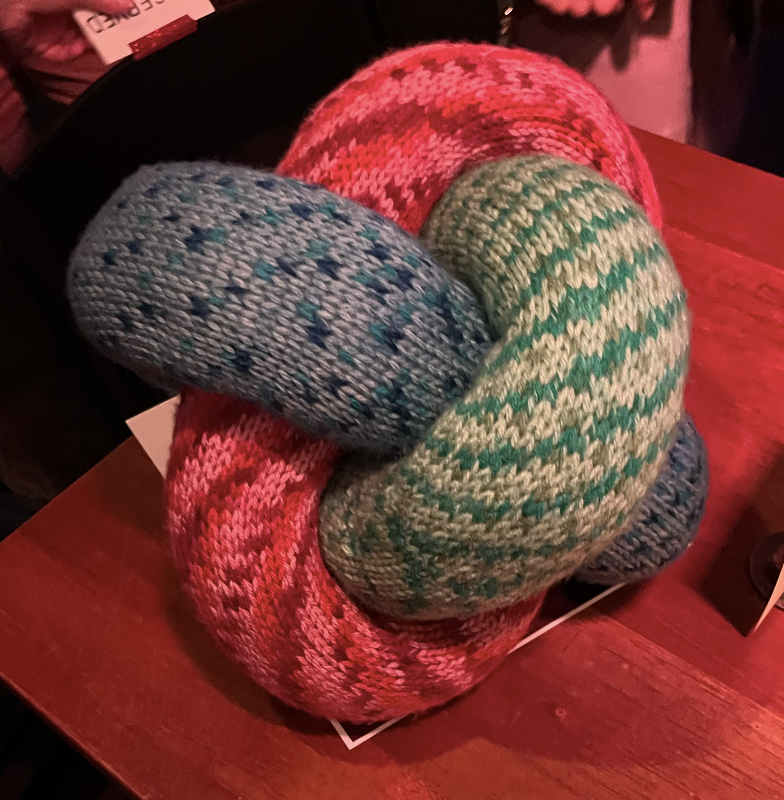
Borromean ring knitting project by knot theorist Laura Taalman

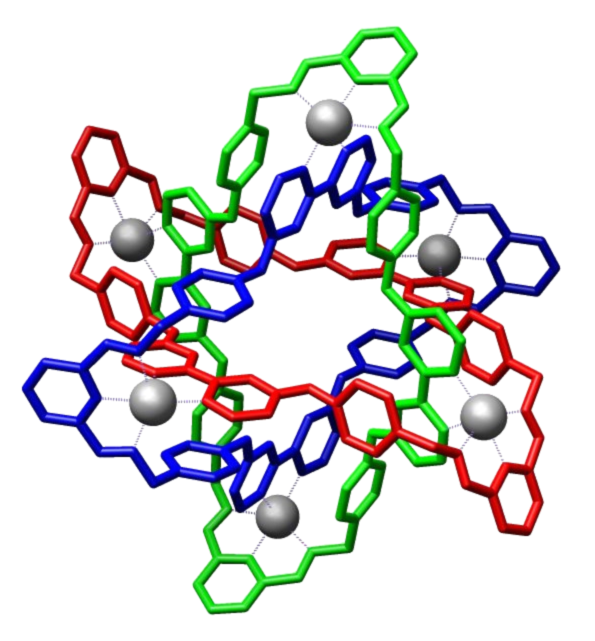
Molecular Borromean rings

A monkey's fist knot is essentially a 3-dimensional representation of the Borromean rings, albeit with three layers, in most cases. Sculptor John Robinson has made artworks with three equilateral triangles made out of sheet metal, linked to form Borromean rings and resembling a three-dimensional version of the valknut. A common design for a folding wooden tripod consists of three pieces carved from a single piece of wood, with each piece consisting of two lengths of wood, the legs and upper sides of the tripod, connected by two segments of wood that surround an elongated central hole in the piece. Another of the three pieces passes through each of these holes, linking the three pieces together in the Borromean rings pattern. Tripods of this form have been described as coming from Indian or African hand crafts.

In chemistry, molecular Borromean rings are the molecular counterparts of Borromean rings, which are mechanically-interlocked molecular architectures. In 1997, biologist Chengde Mao and coworkers of New York University succeeded in constructing a set of rings from DNA. In 2003, chemist Fraser Stoddart and coworkers at UCLA utilised coordination chemistry to construct a set of rings in one step from 18 components. Borromean ring structures have been used to describe noble metal clusters shielded by a surface layer of thiolate ligands. A library of Borromean networks has been synthesized by design by Giuseppe Resnati and coworkers via halogen bond driven self-assembly. In order to access the molecular Borromean ring consisting of three unequal cycles a step-by-step synthesis was proposed by Jay S. Siegel and coworkers.

In physics, a quantum-mechanical analog of Borromean rings is called a halo state or an Efimov state, and consists of three bound particles that are not pairwise bound. The existence of such states was predicted by physicist Vitaly Efimov in 1970, and confirmed by multiple experiments beginning in 2006. This phenomenon is closely related to a Borromean nucleus, a stable atomic nucleus consisting of three groups of particles that would be unstable in pairs. Another analog of the Borromean rings in quantum information theory involves the entanglement of three qubits in the Greenberger–Horne–Zeilinger state.
