= Mary Gertrude Haseman =

American mathematician

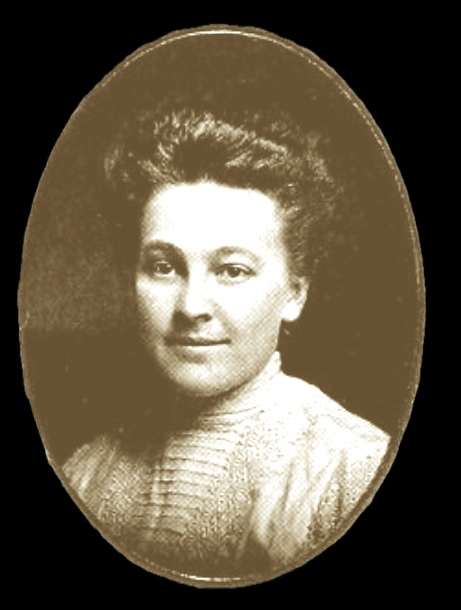
- Born: March 6, 1889; Linton, Indiana, US
- Died: April 9, 1979 (aged 90); Linton, Indiana, US
- Education: Indiana University Bloomington; Bryn Mawr College
- Known for: Knot theory
- Family: John Diederich Haseman brother
- Scientific career
- Fields: Mathematics
- Workplaces: Vincennes University; Roland Park Country School; Harcum College; University of Illinois Urbana-Champaign; Junior College of Connecticut; Hartwick College
- Doctoral advisor: Charlotte Agnas Scott; James Ryals Conner

Mary Gertrude Haseman (March 6, 1889 – April 9, 1979) was an American mathematician known for her work in knot theory.

== Biography ==
Mary Gertrude Haseman was born in or near the small town of Linton, Indiana, the seventh of nine children, to Elizabeth Christine (Schultze) and John Dieterich Haseman. Despite being raised on a farm, she and her siblings all pursued higher education; they all attended college, five had master's degrees, and five, including Mary, earned PhDs.

Haseman attended Indiana University Bloomington and graduated cum laude with a Bachelor of Arts degree in 1910. She taught mathematics at Vincennes University for the academic year 1910–11 before starting a doctoral program in mathematics at Bryn Mawr College in 1911. In 1915, while still working on her dissertation, she moved to Baltimore where she taught at the Roland Park Country School and took graduate classes from Frank Morley at Johns Hopkins University. She successfully defended her PhD thesis at Bryn Mawr College in May 1916 but was not awarded the degree until 1917. Her PhD advisors were Charlotte Agnas Scott and James Ryals Conner. After receiving her PhD, she and her sibling Charles Haseman, who had received a PhD in mathematics under David Hilbert at the University of Göttingen in 1907, became the first US brother-sister duo to earn PhDs in mathematics.

In 1917 she returned to Bryn Mawr to teach for a year at Harcum College, and then she went back to Linton, Indiana, to teach high school for a year. In 1920, she was hired by the University of Illinois Urbana-Champaign as an instructor in mathematics. She taught there until she resigned mid-semester in October 1927. That winter she moved to Connecticut where she was one of the first seven professors — and the first mathematics professor — at the Junior College of Connecticut (now the University of Bridgeport), which opened in February 1928. After a year and a half, she moved to Oneonta, New York, where she was a mathematics professor and the advisor for women at Hartwick College.

The following year she moved to Columbia, Missouri, where her brother Leonard Haseman was the chair of the entomology department at the University of Missouri. In 1936, she returned to Linton, Indiana, where she remained until 1979 when she died at 90 years old.

== Work ==
Haseman was an early contributor to the mathematical field of knot theory and in particular to the study of achiral knots. In knot theory a knot is called chiral if it is not equivalent to its mirror image, otherwise it is achiral (or amphicheiral). Prior to Haseman's investigations, the Scottish mathematician and physicist Peter Guthrie Tait had found all prime achiral knots with 10 or fewer crossings. Tait conjectured that all achiral knots (or perhaps all alternating achiral knots) had to have an even crossing number. (This turned out to be true for alternating knots, but in 1998, Jim Hoste, Morwen Thistlethwaite, and Jeff Weeks discovered a 15-crossing nonalternating achiral knot.) In her graduate studies Haseman looked for achiral knots having more than 10 crossings. Her work during this period lead to her PhD thesis, "On knots with a census of the amphicheirals with twelve crossings," and two articles published in the Transactions of the Royal Society of Edinburgh, one in 1918 and one in 1920. In the first article she presented all 54 prime achiral knots with 12 crossings and seven more that were duplicates. She also found many additional achiral knots with 14 crossings.

Haseman's work marked the end of the exploratory, intuition-based phase of knot theory began by Peter Gutrie Tait. Studying knots by hand was getting ever more challenging, as the numbers of knots with each crossing number increased quickly. Also, by the time of Haseman's thesis, other mathematicians were beginning to apply the new, more technical topological tools to the study of knots.

Morwen Thistlethwaite wrote, "The modern knot tabulator must be indebted to these three [ Thomas Kirkman, Peter Guthrie Tait, and Charles Newton Little ], and also to Mary Haseman, who ventured courageously into the hitherto uncharted regions of 12-crossing knots." Hongler and Weber conclude their article about Tait's and Haseman's work on achiral knots with, "Finally, let us raise high our hat to the remarkable exploration work done by Tait and Haseman. Both have certainly drawn an enormous quantity of diagrams. This impressive and hidden work has resulted in the publication of plates, which are incredibly exhaustive."
