= Perko pair =

Prime knot with crossing number 10

- Arf invariant: 1
- Braid length: 10
- Braid no.: 3
- Bridge no.: 3
- Crosscap no.: 2
- Crossing no.: 10
- Genus: 3
- Hyperbolic volume: 5.63877
- Unknotting no.: 3
- Conway notation: [3:-20:-20]
- A–B notation: 10_{161}/10_{162}
- Dowker notation: 4, 12, -16, 14, -18, 2, 8, -20, -10, -6
- Last / Next: 10_{160} / 10_{162}

Other
- hyperbolic, fibered, prime, reversible

In the mathematical theory of knots, the Perko pair, named after Kenneth Perko, is a pair of entries in classical knot tables that actually represent the same knot. In Dale Rolfsen's knot table, this supposed pair of distinct knots is labeled 10_{161} and 10_{162}. In 1973, while working to complete the classification by knot type of the Tait–Little knot tables of knots up to 10 crossings (dating from the late 19th century), Perko found the duplication in Charles Newton Little's table. This duplication had been missed by John Horton Conway several years before in his knot table and subsequently found its way into Rolfsen's table. The Perko pair gives a counterexample to a "theorem" claimed by Little in 1900 that the writhe of a reduced diagram of a knot is an invariant (see Tait conjectures), as the two diagrams for the pair have different writhes.

In some later knot tables, the knots have been renumbered slightly (knots 10_{163} to 10_{166} are renumbered as 10_{162} to 10_{165}) so that knots 10_{161} and 10_{162} are different. Some authors have mistaken these two renumbered knots for the Perko pair and claimed incorrectly that they are the same.

The Perko pair

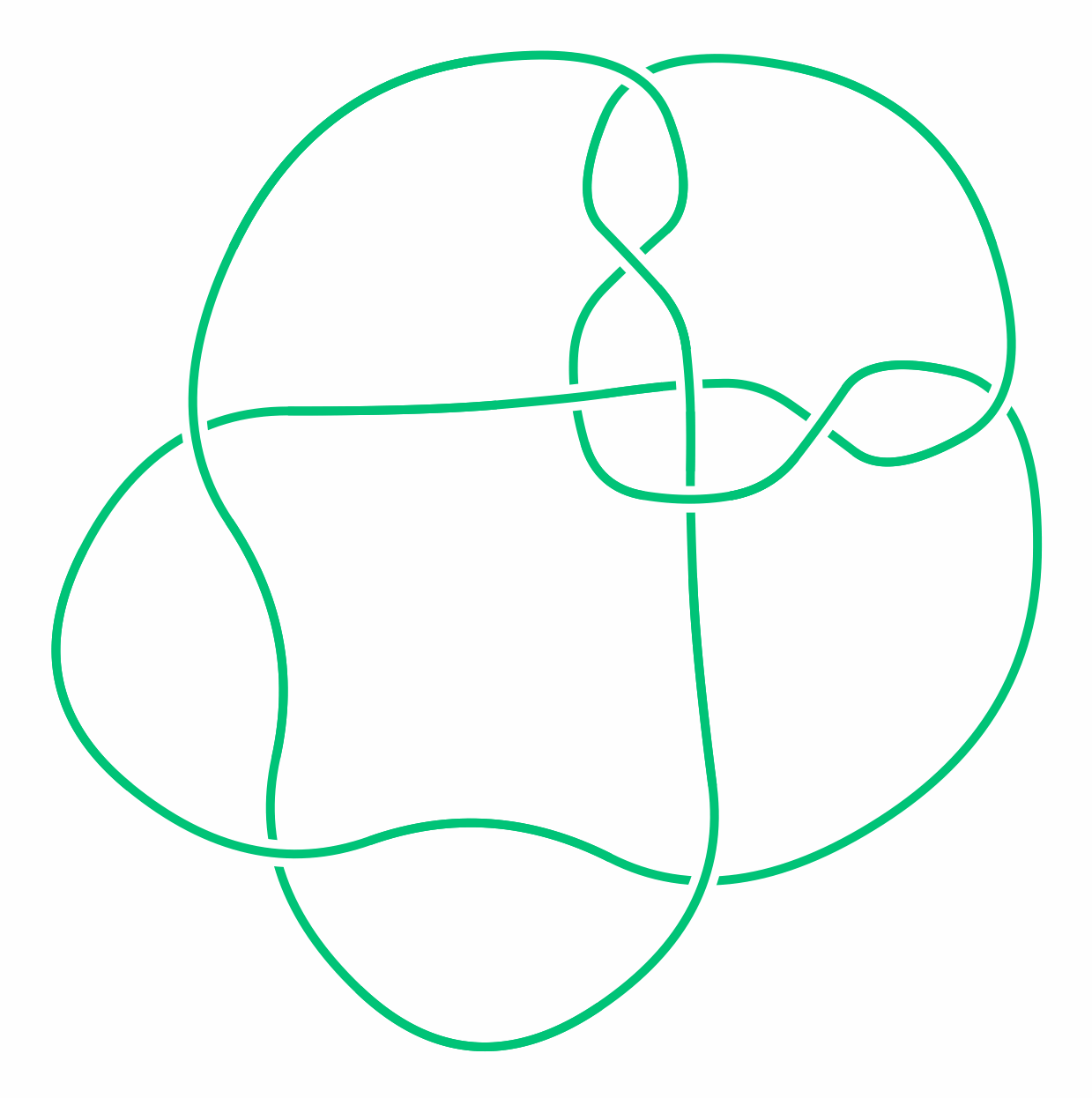
10_{161}

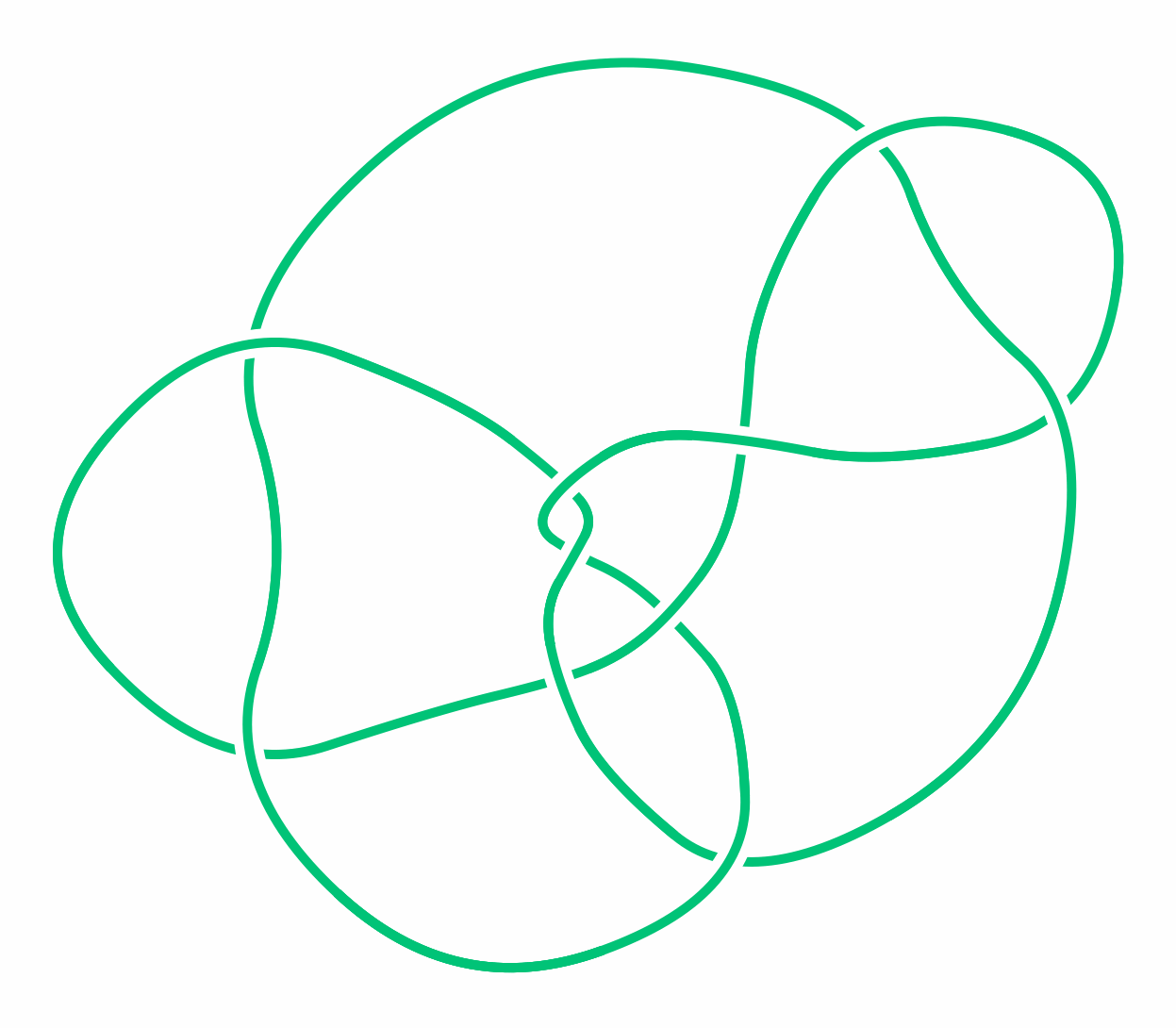
10_{162} (in Rolfsen's original numbering)

The Perko pair was correctly illustrated and explained on the first page of the Science section of the July 8, 1986 New York Times.

The Perko pair is one of five knots with 10 crossings where the topological and smooth 4-genus are different; the former is equal to 2, while the latter is 3.
