= Natural philosophy =

Philosophical study of nature

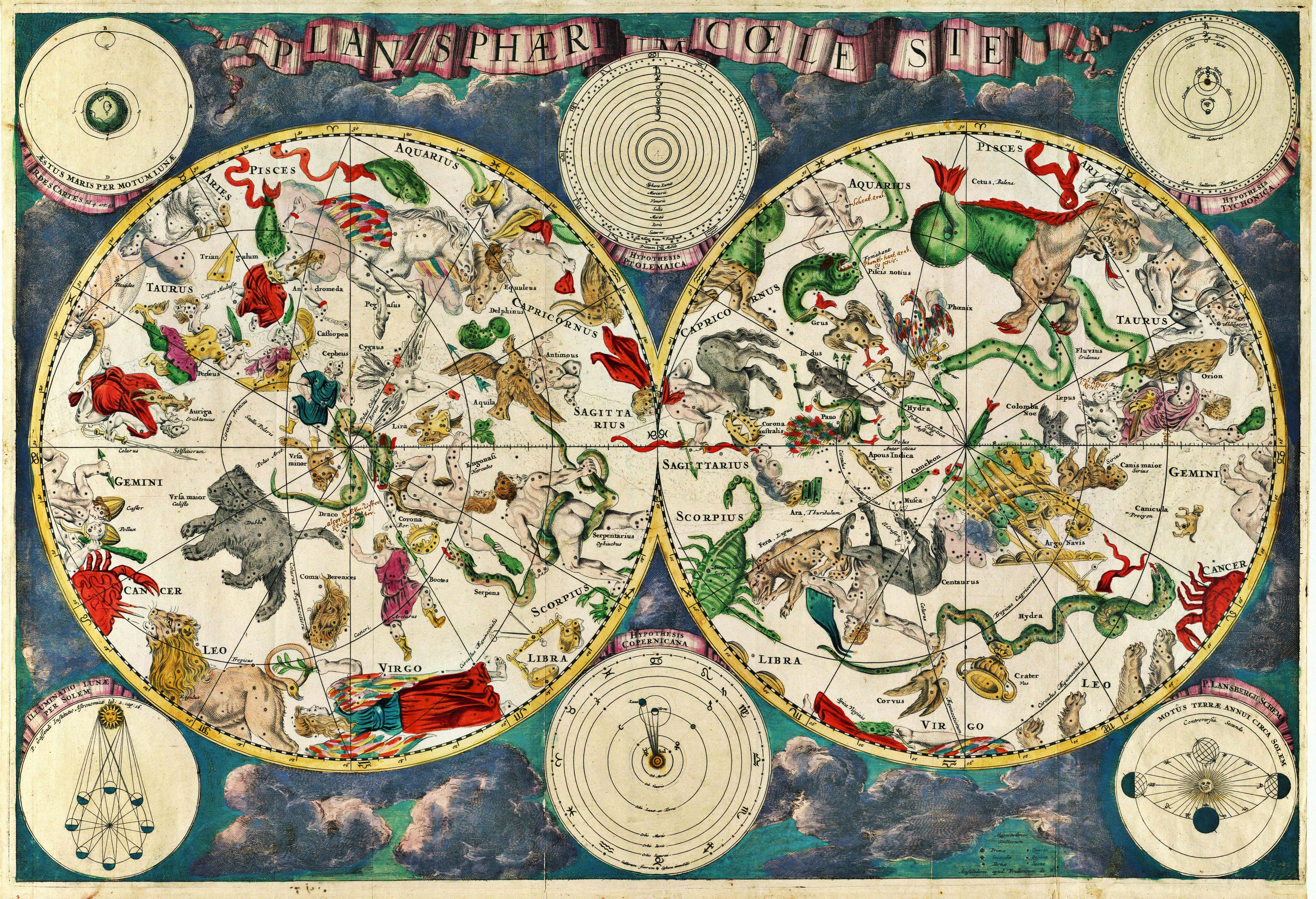
A celestial map from the 17th century, by the Dutch cartographer Frederik de Wit

Natural philosophy, philosophy of nature (from Latin philosophia naturalis), or experimental philosophy, until the late modern period, was the systematic and research-based study of nature and the physical universe, while ignoring any supernatural influence. Used since at least Aristotle (classical antiquity) until the 19th century, the term natural philosophy referred to a branch of philosophy—a broader term then, meaning all rational fields of study and contemplation—that explored topics now considered to fall under the purview of science, such as physics, biology, chemistry, and astronomy. Thus, natural philosophy constitutes the theoretical and methodological foundations of modern science.

The 19th century established the term science as distinct from philosophy in its rigorously empirical and experimental approach, along with its many modern sub-disciplines, plus the founding of various institutions and communities devoted to them. Isaac Newton's book Philosophiæ Naturalis Principia Mathematica (1687) (English: Mathematical Principles of Natural Philosophy) reflects the use of the term natural philosophy in the 17th century. Even in the latter half of the 19th century, the work that helped define much of modern physics bore the title Treatise on Natural Philosophy (1867), authored by Lord Kelvin and Tait.

In the German tradition, Naturphilosophie (philosophy of nature) persisted into the 18th and 19th centuries as an attempt to achieve a speculative unity of nature and spirit, after rejecting the scholastic tradition and replacing Aristotelian metaphysics, along with those of the dogmatic churchmen, with Kantian rationalism. Some of the greatest names in German philosophy are associated with this movement, including Goethe, Hegel, and Schelling. Naturphilosophie was associated with Romanticism and a view that regarded the natural world as a kind of giant organism, as opposed to the philosophical approach of figures such as John Locke and others espousing a more "mechanical philosophy" of the world, regarding it as being like a machine.

== Origin and evolution of the term ==
The term natural philosophy preceded current usage of natural science (i.e. empirical science). Empirical science historically developed out of philosophy or, more specifically, natural philosophy. Natural philosophy was distinguished from the other precursor of modern science, natural history, in that natural philosophy involved reasoning and explanations about nature (and after Galileo, quantitative reasoning), whereas natural history was essentially qualitative and descriptive.

Greek philosophers defined natural philosophy as the combination of beings living in the universe, ignoring things made by humans. The other definition refers to human nature.

In the 14th and 15th centuries, natural philosophy was one of many branches of philosophy, but was not a specialized field of study. The first person appointed as a specialist in Natural Philosophy per se was Jacopo Zabarella, at the University of Padua in 1577.

Modern meanings of the terms science and scientists date only to the 19th century. Before that, science was a synonym for knowledge or study, in keeping with its Latin origin. The term gained its modern meaning when experimental science and the scientific method became a specialized branch of study apart from natural philosophy, especially since William Whewell, a natural philosopher from the University of Cambridge, proposed the term "scientist" in 1834 to replace such terms as "cultivators of science" and "natural philosopher".

From the mid-19th century, when it became increasingly unusual for scientists to contribute to both physics and chemistry, "natural philosophy" came to mean just physics, and the word is still used in that sense in faculty endowments at the University of Oxford and degree titles at the University of Aberdeen. In general, chairs of Natural Philosophy established long ago at the oldest universities are nowadays occupied mainly by physics professors. Isaac Newton's book Philosophiae Naturalis Principia Mathematica (1687), whose title translates to "Mathematical Principles of Natural Philosophy", reflects the then-current use of the words "natural philosophy", akin to "systematic study of nature". Even in the 19th century, a treatise by Lord Kelvin and Peter Guthrie Tait, which helped define much of modern physics, was titled Treatise on Natural Philosophy (1867).

== Scope ==
Plato's earliest known dialogue, Charmides, distinguishes between science or bodies of knowledge that produce a physical result, and those that do not. Natural philosophy has been categorized as a theoretical rather than a practical branch of philosophy (like ethics). Sciences that guide arts and draw on the philosophical knowledge of nature may produce practical results, but these subsidiary sciences (e.g., architecture or medicine) go beyond natural philosophy.

The study of natural philosophy seeks to explore the cosmos by any means necessary to understand the universe. Some ideas presuppose that change is a reality. Although this may seem obvious, there have been some philosophers who have denied the concept of metamorphosis, such as Plato's predecessor Parmenides and later Greek philosopher Sextus Empiricus, and perhaps some Eastern philosophers. George Santayana, in his Scepticism and Animal Faith, attempted to show that the reality of change cannot be proven. If his reasoning is sound, it follows that to be a physicist, one must restrain one's skepticism enough to trust one's senses, or else rely on anti-realism.

René Descartes' metaphysical system of mind–body dualism describes two kinds of substance: matter and mind. According to this system, everything that is "matter" is deterministic and natural—and so belongs to natural philosophy—and everything that is "mind" is volitional and non-natural, and falls outside the domain of philosophy of nature.

== Branches and subject matter ==
Major branches of natural philosophy include astronomy and cosmology, the study of nature on the grand scale; etiology, the study of (intrinsic and sometimes extrinsic) causes; the study of chance, probability and randomness; the study of elements; the study of the infinite and the unlimited (virtual or actual); the study of matter; mechanics, the study of translation of motion and change; the study of nature or the various sources of actions; the study of natural qualities; the study of physical quantities; the study of relations between physical entities; and the philosophy of space and time. (Adler, 1993)

== History ==
Humankind's mental engagement with nature certainly predates civilization and the record of history. Philosophical, and specifically non-religious, thought about the natural world goes back to ancient Greece. These lines of thought began before Socrates, who turned his philosophical studies from speculations about nature to a consideration of man, or in other words, political philosophy. The thought of early philosophers such as Parmenides, Heraclitus, and Democritus centered on the natural world. In addition, three Presocratic philosophers who lived in the Ionian town of Miletus (hence the Milesian School of philosophy), Thales, Anaximander, and Anaximenes, attempted to explain natural phenomena without recourse to creation myths involving the Greek gods. They were called the physikoi ("natural philosophers") or, as Aristotle referred to them, the physiologoi. Plato followed Socrates in concentrating on man. It was Plato's student, Aristotle, who, in basing his thought on the natural world, returned empiricism to its primary place, while leaving room in the world for man. Martin Heidegger observes that Aristotle was the originator of conception of nature that prevailed in the Middle Ages into the modern era:

The Physics is a lecture in which he seeks to determine beings that arise on their own, τὰ φύσει ὄντα (ta physei onta), with regard to their being. Aristotelian "physics" is different from what we mean today by this word, not only to the extent that it belongs to antiquity whereas the modern physical sciences belong to modernity, rather above all it is different by virtue of the fact that Aristotle's "physics" is philosophy, whereas modern physics is a positive science that presupposes a philosophy.... This book determines the warp and weft of the whole of Western thinking, even at that place where it, as modern thinking, appears to think at odds with ancient thinking. But opposition is invariably comprised of a decisive, and often even perilous, dependence. Without Aristotle's Physics there would have been no Galileo.

Aristotle surveyed the thought of his predecessors and conceived of nature in a way that charted a middle course between their excesses.

Plato's world of eternal and unchanging Forms, imperfectly represented in matter by a divine Artisan, contrasts sharply with the various mechanistic Weltanschauungen, of which atomism was, by the fourth century at least, the most prominent... This debate was to persist throughout the ancient world. Atomistic mechanism got a shot in the arm from Epicurus... while the Stoics adopted a divine teleology... The choice seems simple: either show how a structured, regular world could arise out of undirected processes, or inject intelligence into the system. This was how Aristotle... when still a young acolyte of Plato, saw matters. Cicero... preserves Aristotle's own cave-image: if troglodytes were brought on a sudden into the upper world, they would immediately suppose it to have been intelligently arranged. But Aristotle grew to abandon this view; although he believes in a divine being, the Prime Mover is not the efficient cause of action in the Universe, and plays no part in constructing or arranging it... But, although he rejects the divine Artificer, Aristotle does not resort to a pure mechanism of random forces. Instead he seeks to find a middle way between the two positions, one which relies heavily on the notion of Nature, or phusis.

"The world we inhabit is an orderly one, in which things generally behave in predictable ways, Aristotle argued, because every natural object has a "nature"—an attribute (associated primarily with form) that makes the object behave in its customary fashion..." Aristotle recommended four causes as appropriate for the business of the natural philosopher, or physicist, "and if he refers his problems back to all of them, he will assign the 'why' in the way proper to his science—the matter, the form, the mover, [and] 'that for the sake of which'". While the vagaries of the material cause are subject to circumstance, the formal, efficient and final cause often coincide because in natural kinds, the mature form and final cause are one and the same. The capacity to mature into a specimen of one's kind is directly acquired from "the primary source of motion", i.e., from one's father, whose seed (sperma) conveys the essential nature (common to the species), as a hypothetical ratio.

Material cause
An object's motion will behave in different ways depending on the [substance/essence] from which it is made. (Compare clay, steel, etc.)
Formal cause
An object's motion will behave in different ways depending on its material arrangement. (Compare a clay sphere, clay block, etc.)
Efficient cause
That which caused the object to come into being; an "agent of change" or an "agent of movement".
Final cause
The reason that caused the object to be brought into existence.

From the late Middle Ages into the modern era, the tendency has been to narrow "science" to the consideration of efficient or agency-based causes of a particular kind:

The action of an efficient cause may sometimes, but not always, be described in terms of quantitative force. The action of an artist on a block of clay, for instance, can be described in terms of how many pounds of pressure per square inch is exerted on it. The efficient causality of the teacher in directing the activity of the artist, however, cannot be so described… The final cause acts on the agent to influence or induce her to act. If the artist works "to make money," making money is in some way the cause of her action. But we cannot describe this influence in terms of quantitative force. The final cause acts, but it acts according to the mode of final causality, as an end or good that induces the efficient cause to act. The mode of causality proper to the final cause cannot itself be reduced to efficient causality, much less to the mode of efficient causality we call "force."

=== In ancient Greece ===
Early Greek philosophers studied motion and the cosmos. Figures like Hesiod regarded the natural world as offspring of the gods, whereas others like Leucippus and Democritus regarded the world as lifeless atoms in a vortex. Anaximander deduced that eclipses happen because of apertures in rings of celestial fire. Heraclitus believed that the heavenly bodies were made of fire that were contained within bowls. He thought that eclipses happen when the bowl turned away from the earth. Anaximenes is believed to have stated that an underlying element was air, and by manipulating air someone could change its thickness to create fire, water, dirt, and stones. Empedocles identified the elements that make up the world, which he termed the roots of all things, as fire, air, earth, and water. Parmenides argued that all change is a logical impossibility. He gives the example that nothing can go from nonexistence to existence. Plato argues that the world is an imperfect replica of an idea that a divine craftsman once held. He also believed that the only way to truly know something was through reason and logic. Not the study of the object itself, but that changeable matter is a viable course of study.

=== Aristotle's philosophy of nature ===
"An acorn is potentially, but not actually, an oak tree. In becoming an oak tree, it becomes actually what it originally was only potentially. This change thus involves passage from potentiality to actuality — not from non-being to being but from one kind or degree to being another"

Aristotle held many important beliefs that started a convergence of thought for natural philosophy. Aristotle believed that attributes of objects belong to the objects themselves, and share traits with other objects that fit them into a category. He uses the example of dogs to press this point. An individual dog may have very specific attributes (ex. one dog can be black and another brown) but also very general ones that classify it as a dog (ex. four-legged). This philosophy can be applied to many other objects as well. This idea is different from that of Plato, with whom Aristotle had a direct association. Aristotle argued that objects have properties "form" and something that is not part of its properties "matter" that defines the object. The form cannot be separated from the matter. Given the example that you can not separate properties and matter since this is impossible, you cannot collect properties in a pile and matter in another.

Aristotle believed that change was a natural occurrence. He used his philosophy of form and matter to argue that when something changes you change its properties without changing its matter. This change occurs by replacing certain properties with other properties. Since this change is always an intentional alteration whether by forced means or by natural ones, change is a controllable order of qualities. He argues that this happens through three categories of being: non-being, potential being, and actual being. Through these three states the process of changing an object never truly destroys an object's forms during this transition state but rather just blurs the reality between the two states. An example of this could be changing an object from red to blue with a transitional purple phase.

=== Medieval philosophy of motion ===
Medieval thoughts on motion involved much of Aristotle's works Physics and Metaphysics. The issue that medieval philosophers had with motion was the inconsistency found between book 3 of Physics and book 5 of Metaphysics. Aristotle claimed in book 3 of Physics that motion can be categorized by substance, quantity, quality, and place. where in book 5 of Metaphysics he stated that motion is a magnitude of quantity. This disputation led to some important questions to natural philosophers: Which category/categories does motion fit into? Is motion the same thing as a terminus? Is motion separate from real things? These questions asked by medieval philosophers tried to classify motion.

William of Ockham gives a good concept of motion for many people in the Middle Ages. There is an issue with the vocabulary behind motion that makes people think that there is a correlation between nouns and the qualities that make nouns. Ockham states that this distinction is what will allow people to understand motion, that motion is a property of mobiles, locations, and forms and that is all that is required to define what motion is. A famous example of this is Occam's razor, which simplifies vague statements by cutting them into more descriptive examples. "Every motion derives from an agent." becomes "each thing that is moved, is moved by an agent" this makes motion a more personal quality referring to individual objects that are moved.

=== Natural philosophy in the early modern period ===
The scientific method has ancient precedents, and Galileo exemplifies a mathematical understanding of nature, which is a hallmark of modern natural scientists. Galileo proposed that objects falling regardless of their mass would fall at the same rate, as long as the medium they fall in is identical. The 19th-century distinction of a scientific enterprise apart from traditional natural philosophy has its roots in prior centuries. Proposals for a more "inquisitive" and practical approach to the study of nature are notable in Francis Bacon, whose ardent convictions did much to popularize his insightful Baconian method. The Baconian method is employed throughout Thomas Browne's encyclopaedia Pseudodoxia Epidemica (1646–1672), which debunks a wide range of common fallacies through empirical investigation of nature. The late-17th-century natural philosopher Robert Boyle wrote a seminal work on the distinction between physics and metaphysics called, A Free Enquiry into the Vulgarly Received Notion of Nature, as well as The Skeptical Chymist, after which the modern science of chemistry is named, (as distinct from proto-scientific studies of alchemy). These works of natural philosophy are representative of a departure from the medieval scholasticism taught in European universities, and anticipate in many ways, the developments that would lead to science as practiced in the modern sense. As Bacon would say, "vexing nature" to reveal "her" secrets (scientific experimentation), rather than a mere reliance on largely historical, even anecdotal, observations of empirical phenomena, would come to be regarded as a defining characteristic of modern science, if not the very key to its success. Boyle's biographers, in their emphasis that he laid the foundations of modern chemistry, neglect how steadily he clung to the scholastic sciences in theory, practice and doctrine. However, he meticulously recorded observational detail on practical research, and subsequently advocated not only this practice, but its publication, both for successful and unsuccessful experiments, so as to validate individual claims by replication.

For sometimes we use the word nature for that Author of nature whom the schoolmen, harshly enough, call natura naturans, as when it is said that nature hath made man partly corporeal and partly immaterial. Sometimes we mean by the nature of a thing the essence, or that which the schoolmen scruple not to call the quiddity of a thing, namely, the attribute or attributes on whose score it is what it is, whether the thing be corporeal or not, as when we attempt to define the nature of an angel, or of a triangle, or of a fluid body, as such. Sometimes we take nature for an internal principle of motion, as when we say that a stone let fall in the air is by nature carried towards the centre of the earth, and, on the contrary, that fire or flame does naturally move upwards toward heaven. Sometimes we understand by nature the established course of things, as when we say that nature makes the night succeed the day, nature hath made respiration necessary to the life of men. Sometimes we take nature for an aggregate of powers belonging to a body, especially a living one, as when physicians say that nature is strong or weak or spent, or that in such or such diseases nature left to herself will do the cure. Sometimes we take nature for the universe, or system of the corporeal works of God, as when it is said of a phoenix, or a chimera, that there is no such thing in nature, i.e. in the world. And sometimes too, and that most commonly, we would express by nature a semi-deity or other strange kind of being, such as this discourse examines the notion of.

— Robert Boyle, A Free Enquiry into the Vulgarly Received Notion of Nature

Natural philosophers of the late 17th or early 18th century were sometimes insultingly described as 'projectors'. A projector was an entrepreneur who invited people to invest in his invention but – as the caricature went – could not be trusted, usually because his device was impractical. Jonathan Swift satirized natural philosophers of the Royal Society as 'the academy of projectors' in his novel Gulliver's Travels. Historians of science have argued that natural philosophers and the so-called projectors sometimes overlapped in their methods and aims.

== Current work in the philosophy of science and nature ==
In the middle of the 20th century, Ernst Mayr's discussions on the teleology of nature brought up issues that were dealt with previously by Aristotle (regarding final cause) and Kant (regarding reflective judgment).

Especially since the mid-20th-century European crisis, some thinkers argued the importance of looking at nature from a broad philosophical perspective, rather than what they considered a narrowly positivist approach relying implicitly on a hidden, unexamined philosophy. One line of thought grows from the Aristotelian tradition, especially as developed by Thomas Aquinas. Another line springs from Edmund Husserl, especially as expressed in The Crisis of European Sciences. Students of his such as Jacob Klein and Hans Jonas more fully developed his themes. Last, but not least, there is the process philosophy inspired by Alfred North Whitehead's works.

Among living scholars, Brian David Ellis, Nancy Cartwright, David Oderberg, and John Dupré are some of the more prominent thinkers who can arguably be classed as generally adopting a more open approach to the natural world. Ellis (2002) observes the rise of a "New Essentialism". David Oderberg (2007) takes issue with other philosophers, including Ellis to a degree, who claim to be essentialists. He revives and defends the Thomistic-Aristotelian tradition from modern attempts to flatten nature to the limp subject of the experimental method. In Praise of Natural Philosophy: A Revolution for Thought and Life (2017), Nicholas Maxwell argues that we need to reform philosophy and put science and philosophy back together again to create a modern version of natural philosophy.

== See also ==
- Environmental philosophy – Branch of philosophy
- Gentleman scientist – Financially independent scientist
- History of science
- Natural environment – Living and non-living things on Earth
- Natural theology – Theology reliant on rational and empirical arguments
- Naturalism (philosophy) – Belief that only natural laws and forces operate in the universe
- Nature (philosophy) – Philosophical term
- Protoscience – Research field that may become a science
