= Knot tabulation =

Attempt to classify and tabulate all possible knots

A small table of all prime knots (excluding mirror images) with 7 crossings or fewer.

Ever since Sir William Thomson's vortex theory, mathematicians have tried to classify and tabulate all possible knots. By 1998, all 1.7 million prime knots up to 16 crossings had been tabulated, and by 2020 all 350 million knots up to 19 crossings had been tabulated. The major challenge of the process is that many apparently different knots may actually be different geometrical presentations of the same topological entity, and that proving or disproving knot equivalence is much more difficult than it at first seems.

== Beginnings ==
In the 19th century, Sir William Thomson made a hypothesis that the chemical elements were based upon knotted vortices in the aether. In an attempt to make a periodic table of the elements, P. G. Tait, C. N. Little and others started to attempt to count all possible knots. Because their work predated the invention of the digital computer, all work had to be done by hand.

== Perko pair ==
In 1974, Kenneth Perko discovered a duplication in the Tait-Little tables, called the Perko pair. Later knot tables took two approaches to resolving this: some just skipped one of the entries without renumbering, and others renumbered the later entries to remove the hole. The resulting ambiguity has continued to the present day, and has been further compounded by mistaken attempts to correct errors caused by this that were themselves incorrect. For example, Wolfram Web's Perko Pair page erroneously compares two different knots (due to the renumbering by mathematicians such as Burde and Bar-Natan).

== New methods ==
Jim Hoste, Jeff Weeks, and Morwen Thistlethwaite used computer searches to count all knots with 16 or fewer crossings. This research was performed separately using two different algorithms on different computers, lending support to the correctness of its results. Both counts found 1701936 prime knots (including the unknot) with up to 16 crossings. Most recently, in 2020, Benjamin Burton classified all prime knots up to 19 crossings (of which there are almost 300 million).

Starting with three crossings (the minimum for any nontrivial knot), the number of prime knots for each number of crossings is

1, 1, 2, 3, 7, 21, 49, 165, 552, 2176, 9988, 46972, 253293, 1388705, ... (sequence A002863 in the OEIS)

Modern automated methods can now enumerate billions of knots in a matter of days.

== See also ==
- Knot theory
- Knot (mathematics)
- List of prime knots
- Unknotting problem
