= Algebraic link =

Subclass of links in knot theory

Decomposition of the Borromean rings by a Conway sphere (black dotted vertical midline) into two 2-tangles, showing that the Borromean rings form an algebraic link

In the mathematical field of knot theory, an algebraic link is a link that can be decomposed by Conway spheres into 2-tangles. Algebraic links are also called arborescent links. Although algebraic links and algebraic tangles were originally defined by John H. Conway as having two pairs of open ends, they were subsequently generalized to more pairs.
