= Surface Evolver =

- Original author: Kenneth Brakke
- Stable release: 2.70 / August 25, 2013; 12 years ago
- Written in: C
- Operating system: Linux, Windows NT and Mac OS X
- Platform: SGI, HP, MS-Windows and Macintosh
- Available in: English
- Type: Computational fluid dynamics
- License: Freeware
- Website: kenbrakke.com/evolver/evolver.html

Surface Evolver is an interactive program for the study of surfaces shaped by surface tension and other energies, and subject to various constraints. A surface is implemented as a simplicial complex. The user defines an initial surface in a datafile. The Evolver evolves the surface toward minimal energy by a gradient descent method. The aim can be to find a minimal energy surface, or to model the process of evolution by mean curvature. The energy in the Evolver can be a combination of surface tension, gravitational energy, squared mean curvature, user-defined surface integrals, or knot energies. The Evolver can handle arbitrary topology, volume constraints, boundary constraints, boundary contact angles, prescribed mean curvature, crystalline integrands, gravity, and constraints expressed as surface integrals. The surface can be in an ambient space of arbitrary dimension, which can have a Riemannian metric, and the ambient space can be a quotient space under a group action.

Evolver was written at The Geometry Center, sponsored by the National Science Foundation, the Department of Energy, Enterprise Minnesota, and the University of Minnesota.
