= Flype =

Operation on a knot

A flype consists of turning a tangle, T, by 180 degrees.

In the mathematical theory of knots, a flype is a kind of manipulation of knot and link diagrams used in the Tait flyping conjecture. It consists of twisting a part of a knot, a tangle T, by 180 degrees. Flype comes from a Scots word meaning to fold or to turn back ("as with a sock"). Two reduced alternating diagrams of an alternating link can be transformed to each other using flypes. This is the Tait flyping conjecture, proven in 1991 by Morwen Thistlethwaite and William Menasco.

== See also ==
- Reidemeister moves are another commonly studied kind of manipulation to knot diagrams.
