= Split link =

Concept in mathematical knot theory

In the mathematical field of knot theory, a split link is a link that has a (topological) 2-sphere in its complement separating one or more link components from the others. A split link is said to be splittable, and a link that is not split is called a non-split link or not splittable. Whether a link is split or non-split corresponds to whether the link complement is reducible or irreducible as a 3-manifold.

A link with an alternating diagram, i.e. an alternating link, will be non-split if and only if this diagram is connected. This is a result of the work of William Menasco. A split link has many connected, non-alternating link diagrams.
