= Tait conjectures =

The Tait conjectures are three conjectures made by 19th-century mathematician Peter Guthrie Tait in his study of knots. The Tait conjectures involve concepts in knot theory such as alternating knots, chirality, and writhe. All of the Tait conjectures have been solved, the most recent being the Flyping conjecture.

== Background ==
A reduced diagram is one in which all the isthmi are removed.

Tait came up with his conjectures after his attempt to tabulate all knots in the late 19th century. As a founder of the field of knot theory, his work lacks a mathematically rigorous framework, and it is unclear whether he intended the conjectures to apply to all knots, or just to alternating knots. It turns out that most of them are only true for alternating knots. In the Tait conjectures, a knot diagram is called "reduced" if all the "isthmi", or "nugatory crossings" have been removed.

== Crossing number of alternating knots ==
Tait conjectured that in certain circumstances, crossing number was a knot invariant, specifically:

Any reduced diagram of an alternating link has the fewest possible crossings.

In other words, the crossing number of a reduced, alternating link is an invariant of the knot. This conjecture was proved by Louis Kauffman, Kunio Murasugi (村杉 邦男), and Morwen Thistlethwaite in 1987, using the Jones polynomial.

== Writhe and chirality ==
A second conjecture of Tait:

An amphicheiral (or acheiral) alternating link has zero writhe.

This conjecture was also proved by Kauffman and Thistlethwaite.

== Flyping ==
A flype move.

The Tait flyping conjecture can be stated:

Given any two reduced alternating diagrams $D_1$ and $D_2$ of an oriented, prime alternating link: $D_1$ may be transformed to $D_2$ by means of a sequence of certain simple moves called flypes.

The Tait flyping conjecture was proved by Thistlethwaite and William Menasco in 1991. The Tait flyping conjecture implies some more of Tait's conjectures:

Any two reduced diagrams of the same alternating knot have the same writhe.

This follows because flyping preserves writhe. This was proved earlier by Murasugi and Thistlethwaite. It also follows from Greene's work. For non-alternating knots this conjecture is not true; the Perko pair is a counterexample. This result also implies the following conjecture:

Alternating amphicheiral knots have even crossing number.

This follows because a knot's mirror image has opposite writhe. This conjecture is again only true for alternating knots: non-alternating amphichiral knot with crossing number 15 exist.

== See also ==
- Prime knot
- Tangle (knot theory)
