= Not Knot =

1991 mathematical film

Not Knot is a 16-minute film on the mathematics of knot theory and low-dimensional topology, centered on and titled after the concept of a knot complement. It was produced in 1991 by mathematicians at the Geometry Center at the University of Minnesota, directed by Charlie Gunn and Delle Maxwell, and distributed on videotape with a 48-page paperback booklet of supplementary material by A K Peters.

== Topics ==
The video is structured into three parts. It begins by introducing knots, links, and their classification, using the trefoil knot, figure-eight knot, and Borromean rings as examples. It then describes the construction of two-dimensional surfaces such as cones and cylinders by gluing together the edges of flat sheets of paper, the internal geometry of the resulting manifolds or orbifolds, and the behavior of light rays within them. Finally, it uses a three-dimensional version of the same construction method to focus in more depth on the link complement of the Borromean rings and on the hyperbolic geometry of this complementary space, which has a high degree of symmetry and is closely related to classical uniform polyhedra. The view of this space, constructed as the limit of a process of pushing the rings out "to infinity", is immersive, rendered and lit accurately, "like flying through hyperbolic space".

The supplementary material includes a complete script of the video, with black-and-white reproductions of many of its frames, accompanied by explanations at two levels, one set aimed at high school students and another at more advanced mathematics students at the late undergraduate or early graduate level.

== Audience and reception ==
Reviewer James M. Kister writes that making these topics understandable to non-mathematicians in this format, as this video attempts, is "virtually impossible", and in this case "only partially successful". Kister writes of pre-high-school students entranced by the visual images in the video but with no understanding of their meaning, and of academics in non-mathematical disciplines who were equally bewildered. He suggests that the true audience for this video is the mathematics students for whom the more detailed supplementary material was intended.

On the other hand, while agreeing that the material is fully understandable only with significant mathematical background, L. P. Neuwirth writes that "value may surely be found for elementary school students". Knot theorist Mark Kidwell suggests that, even if the details are not understood, the video could be helpful in dispelling the popular misconception that knot theory is not mathematics. And in a review published over ten years after the initial release of this video, Charles Ashbacher writes that the visual effects in this video "are still capable of stunning you", that the mathematics they depict can be clearly followed, and that it should be viewed by "all mathematics students".
