= The Knot Atlas =

Encyclopedic website dedicated to knot theory

The Knot Atlas is a website, an encyclopedia rather than atlas, dedicated to knot theory. It and its predecessor were created by mathematician Dror Bar-Natan, who maintains the current site with Scott Morrison. According to Schiller, the site contains, "beautiful illustrations and detailed information about knots," as does KnotPlot.com. According to the site itself, it is a knot atlas (collection of maps), theory database, knowledge base, and "a home for some computer programs".
