= Conway sphere =

Concept in knot theory

A Conway sphere (black dotted midline) for the Borromean rings

In mathematical knot theory, a Conway sphere, named after John Horton Conway, is a 2-sphere intersecting a given knot or link in a 3-manifold transversely in four points. In a knot diagram, a Conway sphere can be represented by a simple closed curve crossing four points of the knot, the cross-section of the sphere; such a curve does not always exist for an arbitrary knot diagram of a knot with a Conway sphere, but it is always possible to choose a diagram for the knot in which the sphere can be depicted in this way. A Conway sphere is essential if it is incompressible in the knot complement. Sometimes, this condition is included in the definition of Conway spheres.
