= Treatise on Natural Philosophy =

Book by William Thomson

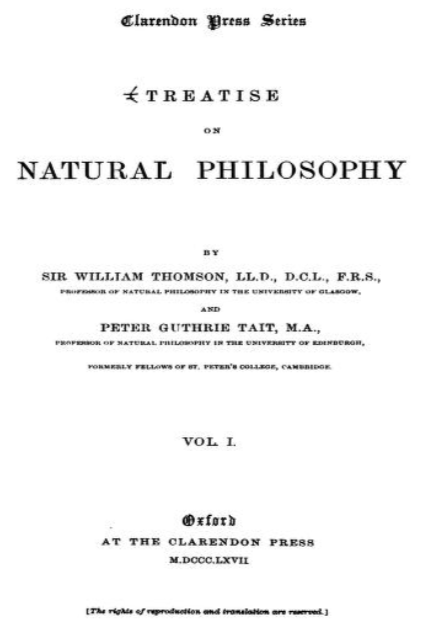
- Title page for Treatise on Natural Philosophy (1867)
- Author: William Thomson and Peter Tait
- Language: English
- Subject: Physics
- Genre: Non-fiction
- Published: 1867
- Publisher: Oxford University Press
- Publication place: United Kingdom

Treatise on Natural Philosophy was an 1867 text book by William Thomson (later Lord Kelvin) and Peter Guthrie Tait, published by Oxford University Press.

The Treatise was often referred to as $T$ and $T^1$, as explained by Alexander Macfarlane:

Maxwell had facetiously referred to Thomson as $T$ and Tait as $T^1$. Hence the Treatise on Natural Philosophy came to be commonly referred to as $T$ and $T^1$ in conversation with mathematicians.

== Reception ==
The first volume was received by an enthusiastic review in Saturday Review:

The grand result of all concurrent research in modern times has been to confirm what was but perhaps a dream of genius, or an instinct of the keen Greek intellect, that all the operations of nature are rooted and grounded in number and figure.

The Treatise was also reviewed as Elements of Natural Philosophy (1873).

Thomson & Tait's Treatise on Natural Philosophy was reviewed by J. C. Maxwell in Nature of 3 July 1879 indicating the importance given to kinematics: "The guiding idea … is that geometry itself is part of the science of motion."

In 1892 Karl Pearson noted that $T$ and $T^1$ perpetuated a "subjectivity of force" that originated with Newton.

In 1902 Alexander Macfarlane ascribed much of the inspiration of the book to William Rankine's 1855 paper "Outlines of the Science of Energetics":

The main object of Thomson and Tait's Treatise on Natural Philosophy was to fill up Rankine's outlines, — expound all branches of physics from the standpoint of the doctrine of energy. The plan contemplated four volumes; the printing of the first volume began in 1862 and was completed in 1867. The other three volumes never appeared. When a second edition was called for, the matter of the first volume was increased by a number of appendices and appeared as two separately bound parts. The volume which did appear, although judged rather difficult reading even by accomplished mathematicians, has achieved great success. It has been translated in French and German; it has educated the new generation of mathematical physicists; and it has been styled the "Principia" of the nineteenth century.
