= William Menasco =

William W. Menasco is a topologist and a professor at the University at Buffalo. He is best known for his work in knot theory.

== Biography ==
Menasco received his B.A. from the University of California, Los Angeles in 1975, and his Ph.D. from the University of California, Berkeley in 1981, where his advisor was Robion Kirby. He served as assistant professor at Rutgers University from 1981 to 1984. He then taught as a visiting professor at the University at Buffalo where he became an assistant professor in 1985, an associate professor in 1991. In 1994 he became a professor at the University at Buffalo where he currently serves.

== Work ==
Menasco proved that a link with an alternating diagram, such as an alternating link, will be non-split if and only if the diagram is connected.

Menasco, along with Morwen Thistlethwaite proved the Tait flyping conjecture, which states that, given any two reduced alternating diagrams $D1,D2$ of an oriented, prime alternating link, $D1$ may be transformed to $D2$ by means of a sequence of certain simple moves called flypes.
