= Geometry Center =

Math research center at the University of Minnesota

Coordinates: 44.973606°N 93.233844°W

The Geometry Center was a mathematics research and education center at the University of Minnesota. It was established by the National Science Foundation in the late 1980s and closed in 1998. The focus of the center's work was the use of computer graphics and visualization for research and education in pure mathematics and geometry.

The center's founding director was Al Marden. Richard McGehee directed the center during its final years. The center's governing board was chaired by David P. Dobkin.

== Geomview ==
Much of the work done at the center was for the development of Geomview, a three-dimensional interactive geometry program. This focused on mathematical visualization with options to allow hyperbolic space to be visualised. It was originally written for Silicon Graphics workstations, and has been ported to run on Linux systems; it is available for installation in most Linux distributions through the package management system. Geomview can run under Windows using Cygwin and under Mac OS X.

Geomview is built on the Object Oriented Graphics Library (OOGL). The displayed scene and the attributes of the objects in it may be manipulated by the graphical command language (GCL) of Geomview. Geomview may be set as a default 3-D viewer for Mathematica.

=== Videos ===
Geomview was used in the construction of mathematical movies including:

- Not Knot, exploring hyperbolic space rendering of knot complements.
- Outside In, a movie about sphere eversion based on William Thurston's method.
- The Shape of Space, exploring possible three-dimensional spaces.

== Other software ==
Other notable software developed at the Center included:

- Surface Evolver, to explore minimal surfaces.
- SnapPea, a hyperbolic 3-manifold analyzer.

== Website ==
Richard McGehee, the center's director, has stated that the website was one of the first one hundred websites ever published. That website is available as an archive.
