= Charles Newton Little =

American mathematician and civil engineer (1858–1923)

Charles Newton Little (1858–1923) was an American mathematician and civil engineer. He was known for his expertise in knot theory, including the construction of a table of knots with ten or fewer crossings.

Little's father was a missionary to Madurai, in India, where Little was born in 1858; his family returned with him to America in 1859. He earned an A.B. from the University of Nebraska in 1879, and continued at Nebraska's Institute of Mathematics and Civil Engineering, where he earned an M.A. in 1884. After this, he entered graduate study at Yale University, and completed his Ph.D. in 1885 under the supervision of Hubert Anson Newton, with a dissertation concerning knot theory.

He returned to the University of Nebraska as an associate professor of civil engineering, and was promoted to full professor in 1889. In 1893 he joined Stanford University as a professor of pure mathematics, after turning down a chair of mathematics at Nebraska. In 1899–1900 he went on leave from Stanford, and traveled to Germany to study mathematics with Felix Klein and David Hilbert. He moved again in 1901 to the University of Idaho, as a professor of civil engineering, and in 1911 was appointed as dean of engineering there.

He died on September 7, 1923, of heart failure, in Berkeley, California.
