= Alternating knot =

One of three non-alternating knots with crossing number 8

In knot theory, a knot or link diagram is alternating if the crossings alternate under, over, under, over, as one travels along each component of the link. A link is alternating if it has an alternating diagram.

Many of the knots with crossing number less than 10 are alternating. This fact and useful properties of alternating knots, such as the Tait conjectures, was what enabled early knot tabulators, such as Tait, to construct tables with relatively few mistakes or omissions. The simplest non-alternating prime knots have 8 crossings (and there are three such: 8_{19}, 8_{20}, 8_{21}).

It is conjectured that as the crossing number increases, the percentage of knots that are alternating goes to 0 exponentially quickly.

Alternating links end up having an important role in knot theory and 3-manifold theory, due to their complements having useful and interesting geometric and topological properties. This led Ralph Fox to ask, "What is an alternating knot?" By this he was asking what non-diagrammatic properties of the knot complement would characterize alternating knots.

In November 2015, Joshua Evan Greene published a preprint that established a characterization of alternating links in terms of definite spanning surfaces, i.e. a definition of alternating links (of which alternating knots are a special case) without using the concept of a link diagram.

Various geometric and topological information is revealed in an alternating diagram. Primeness and splittability of a link is easily seen from the diagram. The crossing number of a reduced, alternating diagram is the crossing number of the knot. This last is one of the celebrated Tait conjectures.

An alternating knot diagram is in one-to-one correspondence with a planar graph. Each crossing is associated with an edge and half of the connected components of the complement of the diagram are associated with vertices in a checker board manner.

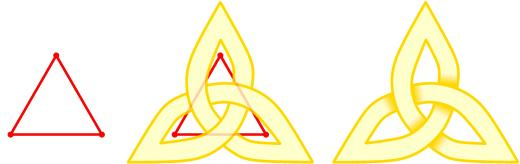

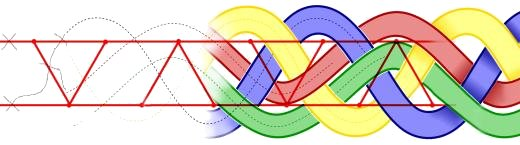

== Tait conjectures ==
The Tait conjectures are:

1. Any reduced diagram of an alternating link has the fewest possible crossings.
2. Any two reduced diagrams of the same alternating knot have the same writhe.
3. Given any two reduced alternating diagrams D_{1} and D_{2} of an oriented, prime alternating link: D_{1} may be transformed to D_{2} by means of a sequence of certain simple moves called flypes. Also known as the Tait flyping conjecture.

Morwen Thistlethwaite, Louis Kauffman and K. Murasugi proved the first two Tait conjectures in 1987 and Morwen Thistlethwaite and William Menasco proved the Tait flyping conjecture in 1991.

== Hyperbolic volume ==
Menasco, applying Thurston's hyperbolization theorem for Haken manifolds, showed that any prime, non-split alternating link is hyperbolic, i.e. the link complement has a hyperbolic geometry, unless the link is a torus link.

Thus hyperbolic volume is an invariant of many alternating links. Marc Lackenby has shown that the volume has upper and lower linear bounds as functions of the number of twist regions of a reduced, alternating diagram.
