= Morwen Thistlethwaite =

Mathematician specializing in knot theory

- Born: Morwen Bernard Thistlethwaite; 5 June 1945 (age 81)
- Education: University of Manchester PhD; University of London (MSc.); University of Cambridge (BA)
- Spouse: Stella Thistlethwaite
- Scientific career
- Fields: Mathematics
- Workplaces: University of Tennessee
- Doctoral advisor: Michael George Barratt

Thistlethwaite unknot

Morwen Bernard Thistlethwaite (born 5 June 1945) is a knot theorist and professor of mathematics for the University of Tennessee in Knoxville. He has made important contributions to both knot theory and Rubik's Cube group theory.

== Biography ==
Morwen Thistlethwaite received his BA from the University of Cambridge in 1967, his MSc from the University of London in 1968, and his PhD from the University of Manchester in 1972 where his advisor was Michael Barratt. He studied piano with Tanya Polunin, James Gibb and Balint Vazsonyi, giving concerts in London before deciding to pursue a career in mathematics in 1975. He taught at the North London Polytechnic from 1975 to 1978 and the Polytechnic of the South Bank, London from 1978 to 1987. He served as a visiting professor at the University of California, Santa Barbara for a year before going to the University of Tennessee, where he currently is a professor. His wife, Stella Thistlethwaite, also teaches at the University of Tennessee-Knoxville. Thistlethwaite's son Oliver is also a mathematician.

== Work ==
=== Tait conjectures ===
Morwen Thistlethwaite helped prove the Tait conjectures, which are:

1. Reduced alternating diagrams have minimal link crossing number.
2. Any two reduced alternating diagrams of a given knot have equal writhe.
3. Given any two reduced alternating diagrams D_{1},D_{2} of an oriented, prime alternating link, D_{1} may be transformed to D_{2} by means of a sequence of certain simple moves called flypes. Also known as the Tait flyping conjecture.
  (adapted from MathWorld—A Wolfram Web Resource. http://mathworld.wolfram.com/TaitsKnotConjectures.html)

Morwen Thistlethwaite, along with Louis Kauffman and Kunio Murasugi proved the first two Tait conjectures in 1987 and Thistlethwaite and William Menasco proved the Tait flyping conjecture in 1991.

=== Thistlethwaite's algorithm ===
Thistlethwaite also came up with a famous solution to the Rubik's Cube. The way the algorithm works is by restricting the positions of the cubes into a subgroup series of cube positions that can be solved using a certain set of moves. The groups are:

- $G_0=\langle L,R,F,B,U,D\rangle$

This group contains all possible positions of the Rubik's Cube.

- $G_1=\langle L,R,F,B,U^2,D^2\rangle$

This group contains all positions that can be reached (from the solved state) with quarter turns of the left, right, front and back sides of the Rubik's Cube, but only double turns of the up and down sides.

- $G_2=\langle L,R,F^2,B^2,U^2,D^2\rangle$

In this group, the positions are restricted to ones that can be reached with only double turns of the front, back, up and down faces and quarter turns of the left and right faces.

- $G_3=\langle L^2,R^2,F^2,B^2,U^2,D^2\rangle$

Positions in this group can be solved using only double turns on all sides.

- $G_4=\{1\}$

The final group contains only one position, the solved state of the cube.

The cube is solved by moving from group to group, using only moves in the current group; for example, a scrambled cube always lies in group G_{0}. A look up table of possible permutations is used that uses quarter turns of all faces to get the cube into group G_{1}. Once in group G_{1}, quarter turns of the up and down faces are disallowed in the sequences of the look-up tables, and the tables are used to get to group G_{2}, and so on, until the cube is solved.

=== Dowker–Thistlethwaite notation ===
Thistlethwaite, along with Clifford Hugh Dowker, developed Dowker–Thistlethwaite notation, a knot notation suitable for computer use and derived from notations of Peter Guthrie Tait and Carl Friedrich Gauss.

== Recognition ==
Thistlethwaite was named a Fellow of the American Mathematical Society, in the 2022 class of fellows, "for contributions to low dimensional topology, especially for the resolution of classical knot theory conjectures of Tait and for knot tabulation".

== See also ==
- Optimal solutions for Rubik's Cube
