= History of knot theory =

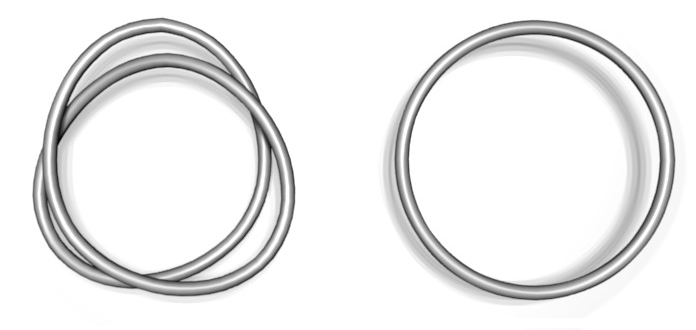
Trivial knots, or unknots

Knots have been used for basic purposes such as recording information, fastening and tying objects together, for thousands of years. The early significant stimulus in knot theory would arrive later with Sir William Thomson (Lord Kelvin) and his vortex theory of the atom.

== History ==
=== Pre-modern ===
Different knots are better at different tasks, such as climbing or sailing. Knots were also regarded as having spiritual and religious symbolism in addition to their aesthetic qualities. The endless knot appears in Tibetan Buddhism, while the Borromean rings have made repeated appearances in different cultures, often symbolizing unity. The Celtic monks who created the Book of Kells lavished entire pages with intricate Celtic knotwork.

=== Early modern ===
Knots were studied from a mathematical viewpoint by Carl Friedrich Gauss, who in 1833 developed the Gauss linking integral for computing the linking number of two knots. His student Johann Benedict Listing, after whom Listing's knot is named, furthered their study.

In 1867 after observing Scottish physicist Peter Tait's experiments involving smoke rings, Thomson came to the idea that atoms were knots of swirling vortices in the æther. Chemical elements would thus correspond to knots and links. Tait's experiments were inspired by a paper of Helmholtz's on vortex-rings in incompressible fluids. Thomson and Tait believed that an understanding and classification of all possible knots would explain why atoms absorb and emit light at only the discrete wavelengths that they do. For example, Thomson thought that sodium could be the Hopf link due to its two lines of spectra.

Tait subsequently began listing unique knots in the belief that he was creating a table of elements. He formulated what is now known as the Tait conjectures on alternating knots. (The conjectures were proved in the 1990s.) Tait's knot tables were subsequently improved upon by C. N. Little and Thomas Kirkman.

James Clerk Maxwell, a colleague and friend of Thomson's and Tait's, also developed a strong interest in knots. Maxwell studied Listing's work on knots. He re-interpreted Gauss's linking integral in terms of electromagnetic theory. In his formulation, the integral represented the work done by a charged particle moving along one component of the link under the influence of the magnetic field generated by an electric current along with the other component. Maxwell also continued the study of smoke rings by considering three interacting rings.

When the luminiferous æther was not detected in the Michelson–Morley experiment, vortex theory became completely obsolete, and knot theory ceased to be of great scientific interest. Modern physics demonstrates that the discrete wavelengths depend on quantum energy levels.

=== Late modern ===
Following the development topology in the early 20th century spearheaded by Henri Poincaré, topologists such as Max Dehn, J. W. Alexander, and Kurt Reidemeister, investigated knots. Out of this sprang the Reidemeister moves and the Alexander polynomial. Dehn also developed Dehn surgery, which related knots to the general theory of 3-manifolds, and formulated the Dehn problems in group theory, such as the word problem. Early pioneers in the first half of the 20th century include Ralph Fox, who popularized the subject. In this early period, knot theory primarily consisted of study into the knot group and homological invariants of the knot complement.

=== Contemporary ===
In 1961 Wolfgang Haken discovered an algorithm that can determine whether or not a knot is non-trivial. He also outlined a strategy for solving the general knot recognition problem, i.e. determining if two given knots are equivalent or not. In the early 1970s, Friedhelm Waldhausen announced the completion of Haken's program based on his results and those of Klaus Johannson, William Jaco, Peter Shalen, and Geoffrey Hemion. In 2003 Sergei Matveev pointed out and filled in a crucial gap.

A few major discoveries in the late 20th century greatly rejuvenated knot theory and brought it further into the mainstream. In the late 1970s William Thurston's hyperbolization theorem introduced the theory of hyperbolic 3-manifolds into knot theory and made it of prime importance. In 1982, Thurston received a Fields Medal, the highest honor in mathematics, largely due to this breakthrough. Thurston's work also led, after much expansion by others, to the effective use of tools from representation theory and algebraic geometry. Important results followed, including the Gordon–Luecke theorem, which showed that knots were determined (up to mirror-reflection) by their complements, and the Smith conjecture.

Interest in knot theory from the general mathematical community grew significantly after Vaughan Jones' discovery of the Jones polynomial in 1984. This led to other knot polynomials such as the bracket polynomial, HOMFLY polynomial, and Kauffman polynomial. Jones was awarded the Fields Medal in 1990 for this work. In 1988 Edward Witten proposed a new framework for the Jones polynomial, utilizing existing ideas from mathematical physics, such as Feynman path integrals, and introducing new notions such as topological quantum field theory. Witten also received the Fields medal, in 1990, partly for this work. Witten's description of the Jones polynomial implied related invariants for 3-manifolds. Simultaneous, but different, approaches by other mathematicians resulted in the Witten–Reshetikhin–Turaev invariants and various so-called "quantum invariants", which appear to be the mathematically rigorous version of Witten's invariants. In the 1980s John Horton Conway discovered a procedure for unknotting knots gradually known as Conway notation.

In 1992, the Journal of Knot Theory and Its Ramifications was founded, establishing a journal devoted purely to knot theory.

In the early 1990s, knot invariants which encompass the Jones polynomial and its generalizations, called the finite type invariants, were discovered by Vassiliev and Goussarov. These invariants, initially described using "classical" topological means, were shown by 1994 Fields Medalist Maxim Kontsevich to result from integration, using the Kontsevich integral, of certain algebraic structures.

These breakthroughs were followed by the discovery of Khovanov homology and knot Floer homology, which greatly generalize the Jones and Alexander polynomials. These homology theories have contributed to further mainstreaming of knot theory.

In the last several decades of the 20th century, scientists and mathematicians began finding applications of knot theory to problems in biology and chemistry. Knot theory can be used to determine if a molecule is chiral (has a "handedness") or not. Chemical compounds of different handedness can have drastically differing properties, thalidomide being a notable example of this. More generally, knot theoretic methods have been used in studying topoisomers, topologically different arrangements of the same chemical formula. The closely related theory of tangles have been effectively used in studying the action of certain enzymes on DNA. The interdisciplinary field of physical knot theory investigates mathematical models of knots based on physical considerations in order to understand knotting phenomena arising in materials like DNA or polymers.

In physics it has been shown that certain hypothetical quasiparticles such as nonabelian anyons exhibit useful topological properties, namely that their quantum states are left unchanged by ambient isotopy of their world lines. It is hoped that they can be used to make a quantum computer resistant to decoherence. Since the world lines form a mathematical braid, braid theory, a related field to knot theory, is used in studying the properties of such a computer, called a topological quantum computer.

A development related and complementary to knot theory is circuit topology which was originally proposed by Alireza Mashaghi, as a theory that focuses on open chains that include intra chain contacts or bonds. The theory was historically developed to address problems in molecular topology and in particular in biology.
