= Knot polynomial =

Knot invariant that is a polynomial

Many knot polynomials are computed using skein relations, which allow one to change the different crossings of a knot to get simpler knots.

In the mathematical field of knot theory, a knot polynomial is a knot invariant in the form of a polynomial whose coefficients encode some of the properties of a given knot.

== History ==
The first knot polynomial, the Alexander polynomial, was introduced by James Waddell Alexander II in 1923. Other knot polynomials were not found until almost 60 years later.

In the 1960s, John Conway came up with a skein relation for a version of the Alexander polynomial, usually referred to as the Alexander–Conway polynomial. The significance of this skein relation was not realized until the early 1980s, when Vaughan Jones discovered the Jones polynomial. This led to the discovery of more knot polynomials, such as the so-called HOMFLY polynomial.

Soon after Jones' discovery, Louis Kauffman noticed the Jones polynomial could be computed by means of a partition function (state-sum model), which involved the bracket polynomial, an invariant of framed knots. This opened up avenues of research linking knot theory and statistical mechanics.

In the late 1980s, two related breakthroughs were made. Edward Witten demonstrated that the Jones polynomial, and similar Jones-type invariants, had an interpretation in Chern–Simons theory. Viktor Vasilyev and Mikhail Goussarov started the theory of finite type invariants of knots. The coefficients of the previously named polynomials are known to be of finite type (after perhaps a suitable "change of variables").

In recent years, the Alexander polynomial has been shown to be related to Floer homology. The graded Euler characteristic of the knot Floer homology of Peter Ozsváth and Zoltan Szabó is the Alexander polynomial.

== Examples ==
Alexander–Briggs notation	Alexander polynomial $\Delta(t)$	Conway polynomial $\nabla(z)$	Jones polynomial $V(q)$	HOMFLY polynomial $H(a,z)$
$0_1$ (Unknot)	$1$	$1$	$1$	$1$
$3_1$ (Trefoil Knot)	$t - 1 + t^{-1}$	$z^2 + 1$	$q^{-1} + q^{-3} - q^{-4}$	$-a^{4}+a^{2}z^{2}+2a^{2}$
$4_1$ (Figure-eight Knot)	$-t + 3 - t^{-1}$	$-z^2+1$	$q^2 - q + 1 - q^{-1} + q^{-2}$	$a^{2}+a^{-2}-z^{2}-1$
$5_1$ (Cinquefoil Knot)	$t^2 - t + 1 - t^{-1} + t^{-2}$	$z^4 + 3z^2 + 1$	$q^{-2} + q^{-4} - q^{-5} + q^{-6} - q^{-7}$	$-a^{6}z^{2}-2a^{6}+a^{4}z^{4}+4a^{4}z^{2}+3a^{4}$
$3_1 \# 3_1$ (Granny Knot)	$\left(t - 1 + t^{-1}\right)^2$	$\left(z^2 + 1\right)^2$	$\left(q^{-1} + q^{-3} - q^{-4}\right)^2$	$\left(-a^{4}+a^{2}z^{2}+2a^{2}\right)^2$
$3_1 \# 3^*_1$ (Square Knot)	$\left(t - 1 + t^{-1}\right)^2$	$\left(z^2 + 1\right)^2$	$\left(q^{-1} + q^{-3} - q^{-4}\right)\left(q + q^{3} - q^{4}\right)$	$\left(-a^{4}+a^{2}z^{2}+2a^{2}\right) \times$ $\left(-a^{-4}+a^{-2}z^{-2}+2a^{-2}\right)$

Alexander–Briggs notation organizes knots by their crossing number.

Alexander polynomials and Conway polynomials can not recognize the difference of left-trefoil knot and right-trefoil knot, while the Jones polynomial can.

The left-trefoil knot.

The right-trefoil knot.

So we have the same situation as the granny knot and square knot since the addition of knots in $\mathbb{R}^3$ is the product of knots in knot polynomials.

== See also ==
=== Specific knot polynomials ===
- Alexander polynomial (and its variant, the Alexander-Conway polynomial)
- Bracket polynomial
- HOMFLY polynomial
- Jones polynomial
- Kauffman polynomial

=== Related topics ===
- Graph polynomial, a similar class of polynomial invariants in graph theory
- Tutte polynomial, a special type of graph polynomial related to the Jones polynomial
- Skein relation for a formal definition of the Alexander polynomial, with a worked-out example.
