= Louis Kauffman =

American mathematician

Louis H. Kauffman
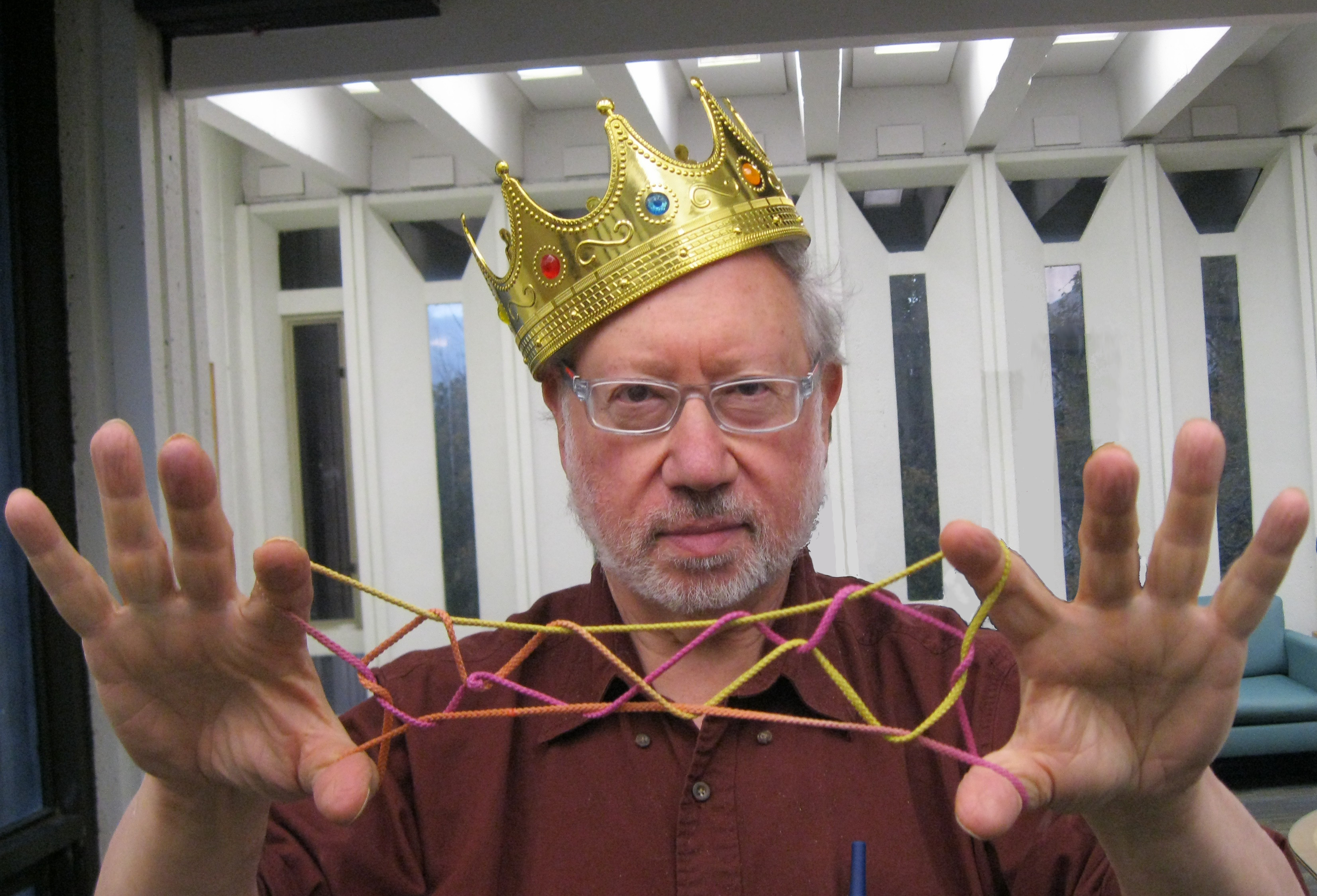
- Kauffman in 2014
- Born: February 3, 1945 (age 81)
- Education: Princeton University; Massachusetts Institute of Technology
- Known for: Kauffman polynomial Bracket polynomial
- Scientific career
- Fields: Mathematics
- Workplaces: University of Illinois at Chicago
- Thesis: Cyclic Branched-Covers, O(n)-Actions and Hypersurface Singularities (1972)
- Doctoral advisor: William Browder

Louis Hirsch Kauffman (born February 3, 1945) is an American mathematician, mathematical physicist, and professor of mathematics in the Department of Mathematics, Statistics, and Computer Science at the University of Illinois at Chicago. He does research in topology, knot theory, topological quantum field theory, quantum information theory, and diagrammatic and categorical mathematics. He is best known for the introduction and development of the bracket polynomial and the Kauffman polynomial.

== Biography ==
Kauffman was valedictorian of his graduating class at Norwood Norfolk Central High School in 1962. He received his B.S. at the Massachusetts Institute of Technology in 1966 and his Ph.D. in mathematics from Princeton University in 1972, with thesis Cyclic Branched-Covers, O(n)-Actions and Hypersurface Singularities written under the supervision of William Browder.

Kauffman has worked at many places as a visiting professor and researcher, including the University of Zaragoza in Spain, the University of Iowa in Iowa City, the Institut des Hautes Études Scientifiques in Bures Sur Yevette, France, the Institut Henri Poincaré in Paris, France, the University of Bologna, Italy, the Federal University of Pernambuco in Recife, Brazil, and the Newton Institute in Cambridge, England.

He is the founding editor and one of the managing editors of the Journal of Knot Theory and Its Ramifications, and editor of the World Scientific Book Series On Knots and Everything. He writes a column entitled Virtual Logic for the journal Cybernetics and Human Knowing. From 2005 to 2008, he was president of the American Society for Cybernetics. He plays clarinet in the ChickenFat Klezmer Orchestra in Chicago.

== Work ==
Kauffman's research interests are in the fields of cybernetics, topology, and mathematical physics. His work is primarily on the topics of knot theory and its connections with statistical mechanics, quantum theory, algebra, combinatorics, and foundations. In topology, he introduced and developed the bracket polynomial and Kauffman polynomial. He has also written on grossone from a finitist perspective.

=== Bracket polynomial ===
In the mathematical field of knot theory, the bracket polynomial, also known as the Kauffman bracket, is a polynomial invariant of framed links. Although it is not an invariant of knots or links (as it is not invariant under type I Reidemeister moves), a suitably "normalized" version yields the famous knot invariant called the Jones polynomial. The bracket polynomial is important in unifying the Jones polynomial with other quantum invariants. In particular, Kauffman's interpretation of the Jones polynomial allows generalization to state sum invariants of 3-manifolds. Subsequently, the bracket polynomial formed the basis for Mikhail Khovanov's construction of a homology for knots and links, creating a stronger invariant than the Jones polynomial and such that the graded Euler characteristic of the Khovanov homology is equal to the original Jones polynomial. The generators for the chain complex of the Khovanov homology are states of the bracket polynomial decorated with elements of a Frobenius algebra.

=== Kauffman polynomial ===
The Kauffman polynomial is a 2-variable knot polynomial due to Louis Kauffman. It is defined as

$$F(K)(a,z)=a^{-w(K)}L(K)$$

where $w(K)$ is the writhe and $L(K)$ is a regular isotopy invariant which generalizes the bracket polynomial.

=== Discrete ordered calculus ===
In 1994, Kauffman and Tom Etter wrote a draft proposal for a non-commutative discrete ordered calculus (DOC), which they presented in revised form in 1996. In the meantime, the theory was presented in a modified form by Kauffman and H. Pierre Noyes together with a presentation of a derivation of free space Maxwell's equations on this basis.

== Awards and honors ==
He won a Lester R. Ford Award (with Thomas Banchoff) in 1978. Kauffman is the 1993 recipient of the Warren McCulloch award of the American Society for Cybernetics and the 1996 award of the Alternative Natural Philosophy Association for his work in discrete physics. He is the 2014 recipient of the Norbert Wiener award of the American Society for Cybernetics.

In 2012 he became a fellow of the American Mathematical Society.

== Publications ==
Louis H. Kauffman is author of several monographs on knot theory and mathematical physics. His publication list numbers over 170. Books:

- 1987, On Knots, Princeton University Press 498 pp.
- 1993, Quantum Topology (Series on Knots & Everything), with Randy A. Baadhio, World Scientific Pub Co Inc, 394 pp.
- 1994, Temperley-Lieb Recoupling Theory and Invariants of 3-Manifolds, with Sostenes Lins, Princeton University Press, 312 pp.
- 1995, Knots and Applications (Series on Knots and Everything, Vol 6)
- 1995, The Interface of Knots and Physics: American Mathematical Society Short Course January 2–3, 1995 San Francisco, California (Proceedings of Symposia in Applied Mathematics), with the American Mathematical Society.
- 1998, Knots at Hellas 98: Proceedings of the International Conference on Knot Theory and Its Ramifications, with Cameron McA. Gordon, Vaughan F. R. Jones and Sofia Lambropoulou,
- 1999, Ideal Knots, with Andrzej Stasiak and Vsevolod Katritch, World Scientific Publishing Company, 414 pp.
- 2002, Hypercomplex Iterations: Distance Estimation and Higher Dimensional Fractals (Series on Knots and Everything, Vol 17), with Yumei Dang and Daniel Sandin.
- 2006, Formal Knot Theory, Dover Publications, 272 pp.
- 2007, Intelligence of Low Dimensional Topology 2006, with J. Scott Carter and Seiichi Kamada.
- 2012, Knots and Physics (4th ed.), World Scientific Publishing Company, ISBN 978-981-4383-00-4

Articles and papers, a selection:

- 2001, The Mathematics of Charles Sanders Peirce, in: Cybernetics & Human Knowing, Vol.8, no.1–2, 2001, pp. 79–110
