= Alternating planar algebra =

The concept of alternating planar algebras first appeared in the work of Hernando Burgos-Soto on the Jones polynomial of alternating tangles. Alternating planar algebras provide an appropriate algebraic framework for other knot invariants in cases the elements involved in the computation are alternating. The concept has been used in extending to tangles some properties of Jones polynomial and Khovanov homology of alternating links.

== Definition ==
An alternating planar algebra is an oriented planar algebra, where the $d$-input planar arc diagrams $D$ satisfy the following conditions:

- The number $k$ of strings ending on the external boundary of $D$ is greater than 0.
- There is complete connection among input discs of the diagram and its arcs, namely, the union of the diagram arcs and the boundary of the internal holes is a connected set.
- The in- and out-strings alternate in every boundary component of the diagram.

A planar arc diagram like this has been denominated type-$A$ planar diagram.

== Applications ==
There are two known applications of the concept of alternating planar algebra.

- It was used for extend to tangles the property that states that the Jones Polynomial of an alternating link is an alternating polynomial.
- It was used for extend to tangles a result about the Khovanov homology that states that The Khovanov homology of an alternating link is supported in two lines.
