= Volume conjecture =

Conjecture in knot theory relating quantum invariants and hyperbolic geometry

- Field: Knot theory
- Conjectured by: Hitoshi Murakami; Jun Murakami; Rinat Kashaev
- Known cases: figure-eight knot; three-twist knot; Borromean rings; torus knots; all knots and links with volume zero; twisted Whitehead links; Whitehead doubles of nontrivial torus knots $T(p,q)$ with $q=2$
- Consequences: Vassiliev invariants detect the unknot

In the branch of mathematics called knot theory, the volume conjecture is an open problem that relates quantum invariants of knots to the hyperbolic geometry of their complements.

== Statement ==
Let O denote the unknot. For any knot $K$, let $\langle K \rangle_N$ be the Kashaev invariant of $K$, which may be defined as

$$\langle K \rangle_N=\lim_{q\to e^{2\pi i/N}}\frac{J_{K,N}(q)}{J_{O,N}(q)}$$,

where $J_{K,N}(q)$ is the $N$-Colored Jones polynomial of $K$. The volume conjecture states that

$$\lim_{N\to\infty} \frac{2\pi\log |\langle K \rangle_N|}{N} = \operatorname{vol}(S^3 \backslash K)$$,

where $\operatorname{vol}(S^3 \backslash K)$ is the simplicial volume of the complement of $K$ in the 3-sphere, defined as follows. By the JSJ decomposition, the complement $S^3 \backslash K$ may be uniquely decomposed into a system of tori

$$S^3 \backslash K = \left( \bigsqcup_i H_i \right) \sqcup \left( \bigsqcup_j E_j \right)$$

with $H_i$ hyperbolic and $E_j$ Seifert-fibered. The simplicial volume $\operatorname{vol}(S^3 \backslash K)$ is then defined as the sum

$$\operatorname{vol}(S^3 \backslash K) = \sum_i \operatorname{vol}(H_i)$$,

where $\operatorname{vol}(H_i)$ is the hyperbolic volume of the hyperbolic manifold $H_i$.

As a special case, if $K$ is a hyperbolic knot, then the JSJ decomposition simply reads $S^3 \backslash K = H_1$, and by definition the simplicial volume $\operatorname{vol}(S^3 \backslash K)$ agrees with the hyperbolic volume $\operatorname{vol}(H_1)$.

== History ==
The Kashaev invariant was first introduced by Rinat M. Kashaev in 1994 and 1995 for hyperbolic links as a state sum using the theory of quantum dilogarithms. Kashaev stated the formula of the volume conjecture in the case of hyperbolic knots in 1997.

Murakami & Murakami (2001) pointed out that the Kashaev invariant is related to the colored Jones polynomial by replacing the variable $q$ with the root of unity $e^{i\pi/N}$. They used an R-matrix as the discrete Fourier transform for the equivalence of these two descriptions. This paper was the first to state the volume conjecture in its modern form using the simplicial volume. They also prove that the volume conjecture implies the following conjecture of Victor Vasiliev:

If all Vassiliev invariants of a knot agree with those of the unknot, then the knot is the unknot.

The key observation in their proof is that if every Vassiliev invariant of a knot $K$ is trivial, then $J_{K,N}(q) = 1$ for any $N$.

== Status ==
The volume conjecture is open for general knots, and it is known to be false for arbitrary links. The volume conjecture has been verified in many special cases, including:

- The figure-eight knot (Tobias Ekholm),
- The three-twist knot (Rinat Kashaev and Yoshiyuki Yokota),
- The Borromean rings (Stavros Garoufalidis and Thang Le),
- Torus knots (Rinat Kashaev and Olav Tirkkonen),
- All knots and links with volume zero (Roland van der Veen),
- Twisted Whitehead links (Hao Zheng),
- Whitehead doubles of nontrivial torus knots $T(p,q)$ with $q=2$ (Hao Zheng).

== Relation to Chern-Simons theory ==
Using complexification, Murakami et al. (2002) conjectured that for a hyperbolic knot $K$,

$$\lim_{N\to\infty} \frac{2\pi\log \langle K\rangle_N}{N} = \operatorname{vol}(S^3\backslash K) + CS(S^3\backslash K)$$,

where $CS$ is the Chern–Simons invariant of the frame field of the hyperbolic structure of $K$. This suggests a relationship between the colored Jones polynomial and complexified Chern–Simons theory.
