= Casson invariant =

In 3-dimensional topology, a part of the mathematical field of geometric topology, the Casson invariant is an integer-valued invariant of oriented integral homology 3-spheres, introduced by Andrew Casson.

Kevin Walker (1992) found an extension to rational homology 3-spheres, called the Casson–Walker invariant, and Christine Lescop (1995) extended the invariant to all closed oriented 3-manifolds.

== Definition ==
A Casson invariant is a surjective map λ from oriented integral homology 3-spheres to Z satisfying the following properties:

- λ(S^{3}) = 0.
- Let Σ be an integral homology 3-sphere. Then for any knot K and for any integer n, the difference

$$\lambda\left(\Sigma+\frac{1}{n+1}\cdot K\right)-\lambda\left(\Sigma+\frac{1}{n}\cdot K\right)$$

is independent of n. Here $\Sigma+\frac{1}{m}\cdot K$ denotes $\frac{1}{m}$ Dehn surgery on Σ by K.

- For any boundary link K ∪ L in Σ the following expression is zero:

$$\lambda\left(\Sigma+\frac{1}{m+1}\cdot K+\frac{1}{n+1}\cdot L\right) -\lambda\left(\Sigma+\frac{1}{m}\cdot K+\frac{1}{n+1}\cdot L\right)-\lambda\left(\Sigma+\frac{1}{m+1}\cdot K+\frac{1}{n}\cdot L\right) +\lambda\left(\Sigma+\frac{1}{m}\cdot K+\frac{1}{n}\cdot L\right)$$

The Casson invariant is unique (with respect to the above properties) up to an overall multiplicative constant.

== Properties ==
- If K is the trefoil then

$$\lambda\left(\Sigma+\frac{1}{n+1}\cdot K\right)-\lambda\left(\Sigma+\frac{1}{n}\cdot K\right)=\pm 1$$.

- The Casson invariant is 1 (or −1) for the Poincaré homology sphere.
- The Casson invariant changes sign if the orientation of M is reversed.
- The Rokhlin invariant of M is equal to the Casson invariant mod 2.
- The Casson invariant is additive with respect to connected summing of homology 3-spheres.
- The Casson invariant is a sort of Euler characteristic for Floer homology.
- For any integer n

$$\lambda \left ( M + \frac{1}{n+1}\cdot K\right ) - \lambda \left ( M + \frac{1}{n}\cdot K\right ) = \phi_1 (K),$$

where $\phi_1 (K)$ is the coefficient of $z^2$ in the Alexander–Conway polynomial $\nabla_K(z)$, and is congruent (mod 2) to the Arf invariant of K.

- The Casson invariant is the degree 1 part of the Le–Murakami–Ohtsuki invariant.
- The Casson invariant for the integer Homology Sphere $\Sigma(p,q,r)$ is given by the formula:

$$\lambda(\Sigma(p,q,r))=-\frac{1}{8}\left[1-\frac{1}{3pqr}\left(1-p^2q^2r^2+p^2q^2+q^2r^2+p^2r^2\right)
-d(p,qr)-d(q,pr)-d(r,pq)\right]$$

where

$$d(a,b)=-\frac{1}{a}\sum_{k=1}^{a-1}\cot\left(\frac{\pi k}{a}\right)\cot\left(\frac{\pi bk}{a}\right)$$

== The Casson invariant as a count of representations ==
Informally speaking, the Casson invariant counts half the number of conjugacy classes of representations of the fundamental group of a homology 3-sphere M into the group SU(2). This can be made precise as follows.

The representation space of a compact oriented 3-manifold M is defined as $\mathcal{R}(M)=R^{\mathrm{irr}}(M)/SU(2)$ where $R^{\mathrm{irr}}(M)$ denotes the space of irreducible SU(2) representations of $\pi_1 (M)$. For a Heegaard splitting $\Sigma=M_1 \cup_F M_2$ of $M$, the Casson invariant equals $\frac{(-1)^g}{2}$ times the algebraic intersection of $\mathcal{R}(M_1)$ with $\mathcal{R}(M_2)$.

== Generalizations ==
=== Rational homology 3-spheres ===
Kevin Walker found an extension of the Casson invariant to rational homology 3-spheres. A Casson-Walker invariant is a surjective map λ_{CW} from oriented rational homology 3-spheres to Q satisfying the following properties:

1. λ(S^{3}) = 0.

2. For every 1-component Dehn surgery presentation (K, μ) of an oriented rational homology sphere M′ in an oriented rational homology sphere M:

$$\lambda_{CW}(M^\prime)=\lambda_{CW}(M)+\frac{\langle m,\mu\rangle}{\langle m,\nu\rangle\langle \mu,\nu\rangle}\Delta_{W}^{\prime\prime}(M-K)(1)+\tau_{W}(m,\mu;\nu)$$

where:

- m is an oriented meridian of a knot K and μ is the characteristic curve of the surgery.
- ν is a generator the kernel of the natural map H_{1}(∂N(K), Z) → H_{1}(M−K, Z).
- $\langle\cdot,\cdot\rangle$ is the intersection form on the tubular neighbourhood of the knot, N(K).
- Δ is the Alexander polynomial normalized so that the action of t corresponds to an action of the generator of $H_1(M-K)/\text{Torsion}$ in the infinite cyclic cover of M−K, and is symmetric and evaluates to 1 at 1.
- $\tau_{W}(m,\mu;\nu)= -\mathrm{sgn}\langle y,m\rangle s(\langle x,m\rangle,\langle y,m\rangle)+\mathrm{sgn}\langle y,\mu\rangle s(\langle x,\mu\rangle,\langle y,\mu\rangle)+\frac{(\delta^2-1)\langle m,\mu\rangle}{12\langle m,\nu\rangle\langle \mu,\nu\rangle}$

where x, y are generators of H_{1}(∂N(K), Z) such that $\langle x,y\rangle=1$, v = δy for an integer δ and s(p, q) is the Dedekind sum.

Note that for integer homology spheres, the Walker's normalization is twice that of Casson's: $\lambda_{CW}(M) = 2 \lambda(M)$.

=== Compact oriented 3-manifolds ===
Christine Lescop defined an extension λ_{CWL} of the Casson-Walker invariant to oriented compact 3-manifolds. It is uniquely characterized by the following properties:

- If the first Betti number of M is zero,

$$\lambda_{CWL}(M)=\tfrac{1}{2}\left\vert H_1(M)\right\vert\lambda_{CW}(M)$$.

- If the first Betti number of M is one,

$$\lambda_{CWL}(M)=\frac{\Delta^{\prime\prime}_M(1)}{2}-\frac{\mathrm{torsion}(H_1(M,\mathbb{Z}))}{12}$$

where Δ is the Alexander polynomial normalized to be symmetric and take a positive value at 1.

- If the first Betti number of M is two,

$$\lambda_{CWL}(M)=\left\vert\mathrm{torsion}(H_1(M))\right\vert\mathrm{Link}_M (\gamma,\gamma^\prime)$$

where γ is the oriented curve given by the intersection of two generators $S_1,S_2$ of $H_2(M;\mathbb{Z})$ and $\gamma^\prime$ is the parallel curve to γ induced by the trivialization of the tubular neighbourhood of γ determined by $S_1, S_2$.

- If the first Betti number of M is three, then for a,b,c a basis for $H_1(M;\mathbb{Z})$, then

$$\lambda_{CWL}(M)=\left\vert\mathrm{torsion}(H_1(M;\mathbb{Z}))\right\vert\left((a\cup b\cup c)([M])\right)^2$$.

- If the first Betti number of M is greater than three, $\lambda_{CWL}(M)=0$.

The Casson–Walker–Lescop invariant has the following properties:

- When the orientation of M changes the behavior of $\lambda_{CWL}(M)$ depends on the first Betti number $b_1(M) = \operatorname{rank} H_1(M;\mathbb{Z})$of M: if $\overline{M}$ is M with the opposite orientation, then

$$\lambda_{CWL}(\overline{M}) = (-1)^{b_1(M)+1}\lambda_{CWL}(M).$$

That is, if the first Betti number of M is odd the Casson–Walker–Lescop invariant is unchanged, while if it is even it changes sign.

- For connect-sums of manifolds

$$\lambda_{CWL}(M_1\#M_2)=\left\vert H_1(M_2)\right\vert\lambda_{CWL}(M_1)+\left\vert H_1(M_1)\right\vert\lambda_{CWL}(M_2)$$

=== SU(N) ===
In 1990, C. Taubes showed that the SU(2) Casson invariant of a 3-homology sphere M has a gauge theoretic interpretation as the Euler characteristic of $\mathcal{A}/\mathcal{G}$, where $\mathcal{A}$ is the space of SU(2) connections on M and $\mathcal{G}$ is the group of gauge transformations. He regarded the Chern–Simons invariant as a $S^1$-valued Morse function on $\mathcal{A}/\mathcal{G}$ and used invariance under perturbations to define an invariant which he equated with the SU(2) Casson invariant. (Taubes (1990))

H. Boden and C. Herald (1998) used a similar approach to define an SU(3) Casson invariant for integral homology 3-spheres.
