= Hernando Burgos-Soto =

Colombian-Canadian mathematician

- Born: Colombia
- Education: National University of Colombia, University of Toronto
- Scientific career
- Fields: Mathematics
- Workplaces: George Brown College
- Doctoral advisor: Dror Bar-Natan

Hernando Burgos Soto is a Canadian (Colombian born) educator and mathematician, professor of mathematics at George Brown College. He is the author of several math papers in which he introduced some mathematics concepts and extended to tangles some celebrated results of knot theory about the Khovanov homology and the Jones polynomial. During his career as a mathematician, his interests have included Mathematical Statistics, Knot Theory, Algebraic Topology and more recently Mathematical Finance. He is comfortable writing in English and Spanish. When writing in Spanish, he works in the area of prose fiction writing short stories. Some of his short stories were published at the website Cuentos y Cuentos.

== Education ==
Professor Burgos Soto holds a BSc.Ed in mathematics at the University of Atlántico and a MSc in Mathematics from the University of Valle. He earned a PhD in mathematics from National University of Colombia in 2009, and completed his dissertation at University of Toronto under the guidance of professor Dror Bar-Natan.

== Research ==
His works include regression diagnostic analysis for General Linear Models, extension to tangles of Morwen Thistlethwaite's result on the alternation of the Jones polynomial for alternating links, and a Lee's result on Khovanov homology for links, that states that the Khovanov homology for alternating links is supported in two lines. During his works Professor Burgos has introduced some Mathematical concepts such as: Gravity Information in a tangle diagram, Alternating planar algebras, and Rotation Number of Smoothings.

== Selected Publication ==
- Burgos-Soto, Hernando (2010) The Jones Polynomial of Alternating Tangles, Journal of Knot Theory and Its Ramifications, Volume 19, Issue 11, Nov. 2010, pages 1487–1505
