= Willerton =

Willerton is a surname. Notable people with this surname include:

- Amy Willerton (born 1992), English TV presenter, model and beauty pageant titleholder
- Kristof Willerton (born 1993), British gymnast

== See also ==
- Willerton's fish, named after Simon Willerton
