= Willerton's fish =

In knot theory, Willerton's fish is an unexplained relationship between the first two Vassiliev invariants of a knot. These invariants are c_{2}, the quadratic coefficient of the Alexander–Conway polynomial, and j_{3}, an order-three invariant derived from the Jones polynomial.

When the values of c_{2} and j_{3}, for knots of a given fixed crossing number, are used as the x and y coordinates of a scatter plot, the points of the plot appear to fill a fish-shaped region of the plane, with a lobed body and two sharp tail fins. The region appears to be bounded by cubic curves, suggesting that the crossing number, c_{2}, and j_{3} may be related to each other by not-yet-proven inequalities.

This shape is named after Simon Willerton, who first observed this phenomenon and described the shape of the scatterplots as "fish-like".
