= Khovanov homology =

Invariant of mathematical knots

In mathematics, Khovanov homology is an oriented link invariant that arises as the cohomology of a cochain complex. It may be regarded as a categorification of the Jones polynomial.

It was developed in the late 1990s by Mikhail Khovanov.

== Overview ==
To any link diagram $D$ representing a link $L$, we assign the Khovanov bracket $\left[ D \right]$, a cochain complex of graded vector spaces. This is the analogue of the Kauffman bracket in the construction of the Jones polynomial. Next, we normalise $\left[ D \right]$ by a series of degree shifts (in the graded vector spaces) and height shifts (in the cochain complex) to obtain a new cochain complex $C(D)$. The cohomology of this cochain complex turns out to be an invariant of $L$, and its graded Euler characteristic is the Jones polynomial of $L$.

== Definition ==
This definition follows the formalism given in Dror Bar-Natan's 2002 paper.

Let $\{l\}$ denote the degree shift operation on graded vector spaces—that is, the homogeneous component in dimension $m$ is shifted up to dimension $m+l$.

Similarly, let $[s]$ denote the height shift operation on cochain complexes—that is, the $r$th vector space or module in the complex is shifted along to the $(r+s)$th place, with all the differential maps being shifted accordingly.

Let $V$ be a graded vector space with one generator $q$ of degree 1, and one generator $q^{-1}$ of degree $-1$.

Now take an arbitrary diagram $D$ representing a link $L$. The axioms for the Khovanov bracket are as follows:

1. $[\emptyset] = (0 \to \Z \to 0)$, where $\emptyset$ denotes the empty link.
2. $[\text{O } D] = V \otimes [D]$, where O denotes an unlinked trivial component.
3. $[D] = \mathbf{F}(0 \to [D_0] \to [D_1]\{1\} \to 0)$

In the third of these, $\mathbf{F}$ denotes the `flattening' operation, where a single complex is formed from a double complex by taking direct sums along the diagonals. Also, $D_0$ denotes the `0-smoothing' of a chosen crossing in $D$, and $D_1$ denotes the `1-smoothing', analogously to the skein relation for the Kauffman bracket.

Next, we construct the `normalised' complex $\mathbf{C}(D) = [D][-n_{-}] \{n_{+}-2n_{-}\}$, where $n_{-}$ denotes the number of left-handed crossings in the chosen diagram for $D$, and $n_{+}$ the number of right-handed crossings.

The Khovanov homology of $L$ is then defined as the cohomology $\mathbf{H}(L)$ of this complex $\mathbf{C}(D)$. It turns out that the Khovanov homology is indeed an invariant of $L$, and does not depend on the choice of diagram. The graded Euler characteristic of $\mathbf{H}(L)$ turns out to be the Jones polynomial of $L$. However, $\mathbf{H}(L)$ has been shown to contain more information about $L$ than the Jones polynomial, but the exact details are not yet fully understood.

In 2006 Dror Bar-Natan developed a computer program to calculate the Khovanov homology (or category) for any knot.

== Related theories ==
One of the most interesting aspects of Khovanov's homology is that its exact sequences are formally similar to those arising in the Floer homology of 3-manifolds. Moreover, it has been used to produce another proof of a result first demonstrated using gauge theory and its cousins: Jacob Rasmussen's new proof of a theorem of Peter Kronheimer and Tomasz Mrowka, formerly known as the Milnor conjecture (see below). There is a spectral sequence relating Khovanov homology with the knot Floer homology of Peter Ozsváth and Zoltán Szabó (Dowlin 2018). This spectral sequence settled an earlier conjecture on the relationship between the two theories (Dunfield et al. 2005). Another spectral sequence (Ozsváth-Szabó 2005) relates a variant of Khovanov homology with the Heegaard Floer homology of the branched double cover along a knot. A third (Bloom 2009) converges to a variant of the monopole Floer homology of the branched double cover. In 2010 Kronheimer and Mrowka exhibited a spectral sequence abutting to their instanton knot Floer homology group and used this to show that Khovanov Homology (like the instanton knot Floer homology) detects the unknot.

Khovanov homology is related to the representation theory of the Lie algebra $\mathfrak{sl}_2$. Mikhail Khovanov and Lev Rozansky have since defined homology theories associated to $\mathfrak{sl}_n$ for all $n$. In 2003, Catharina Stroppel extended Khovanov homology to an invariant of tangles (a categorified version of Reshetikhin-Turaev invariants) which also generalizes to $\mathfrak{sl}_n$ for all $n$. Paul Seidel and Ivan Smith have constructed a singly graded knot homology theory using Lagrangian intersection Floer homology, which they conjecture to be isomorphic to a singly graded version of Khovanov homology. Ciprian Manolescu has since simplified their construction and shown how to recover the Jones polynomial from the cochain complex underlying his version of the Seidel–Smith invariant.

== The relation to link (knot) polynomials ==
At International Congress of Mathematicians in 2006 Mikhail Khovanov provided the following explanation for the relation to knot polynomials from the view point of Khovanov homology. The skein relation for three links $L_1,L_2$ and $L_3$ is described as

$$\lambda P(L_1)-\lambda^{-1}P(L_2)=(q-q^{-1})P(L_3).$$

Substituting $\lambda=q^n, n\le0$ leads to a link polynomial invariant $P_n(L)\in\Z[q,q^{-1}]$, normalized so that

$$\begin{align}
P_n(unknot) & =q^{n-1}+q^{n-3}+\cdots+q^{1-n} && n > 0 \\
P_0(unknot) &= 1
\end{align}$$

For $n > 1$ the polynomial $P_n(L)$ can be interpreted via the representation theory of quantum group $U_q(sl(n))$ and $P_0(L)$ via that of the quantum Lie superalgebra $U_q(gl(1|1))$.

- The Alexander polynomial $P_0(L)$ is the Euler characteristic of a bigraded knot homology theory.
- $P_1(L)=1$ is trivial.
- The Jones polynomial $P_2(L)$ is the Euler characteristic of a bigraded link homology theory.
- The entire HOMFLY-PT polynomial is the Euler characteristic of a triply graded link homology theory.

== Applications ==
The first application of Khovanov homology was provided by Jacob Rasmussen, who defined the s-invariant using Khovanov homology. This integer valued invariant of a knot gives a bound on the slice genus, and is sufficient to prove the Milnor conjecture.

In 2010, Kronheimer and Mrowka proved that the Khovanov homology detects the unknot. The categorified theory has more information than the non-categorified theory. Although the Khovanov homology detects the unknot, it is not yet known if the Jones polynomial does.
