= Quantum invariant =

Concept in mathematical knot theory

In the mathematical field of knot theory, a quantum knot invariant or quantum invariant of a knot or link is a linear sum of colored Jones polynomial of surgery presentations of the knot complement.

== List of invariants ==
- Finite type invariant
- Kontsevich invariant
- Kashaev's invariant
- Witten–Reshetikhin–Turaev invariant (Chern–Simons)
- Invariant differential operator
- Rozansky–Witten invariant
- Vassiliev knot invariant
- Dehn invariant
- LMO invariant
- Turaev–Viro invariant
- Dijkgraaf–Witten invariant
- Reshetikhin–Turaev invariant
- Tau-invariant
- I-Invariant
- Klein J-invariant
- Quantum isotopy invariant
- Ermakov–Lewis invariant
- Hermitian invariant
- Goussarov–Habiro theory of finite-type invariant
- Linear quantum invariant (orthogonal function invariant)
- Murakami–Ohtsuki TQFT
- Generalized Casson invariant
- Casson-Walker invariant
- Khovanov–Rozansky invariant
- HOMFLY polynomial
- K-theory invariants
- Atiyah–Patodi–Singer eta invariant
- Link invariant
- Casson invariant
- Seiberg–Witten invariants
- Gromov–Witten invariant
- Arf invariant
- Hopf invariant

== See also ==
- Invariant theory
- Framed knot
- Chern–Simons theory
- Algebraic geometry
- Seifert surface
- Geometric invariant theory
