= Grossone =

Quasi-infinite number in mathematics

A grossone (symbol ①) is a numeral intended to allow for the performance of numerical computations with infinities and infinitesimals. In the grossone framework, ① is introduced as a natural number which is assigned the properties which would be possessed by a last element of the set of natural numbers, such as would be seen with, for example, the quantity being approached with a limit increasing to infinity by finite degrees: it will always be finite, but seen as a completed whole the value it yields is ①. ① occupies a quasi-infinite, quasi-finite space.

① has been compared to i, which serves as a symbol for a square root of negative one: though no real number is the square root of a negative number, for some calculations it is useful to introduce an imaginary number where one can perform arithmetic on a number with such a property.

While similar to strictly infinite numbers, ① is assigned a different value from both Cantor's aleph number ℵ_{0} and the ordinal number ω, and it also differs from the general symbol for infinity ∞ by being more specifically defined.

The grossone has been studied in mathematical logic, numerical analysis, optimization, cellular automata, probability, and philosophy of mathematics, though is criticized by some mathematicians for being either insufficiently defined or trivial.

== Background ==
Originally developed by the mathematician Yaroslav D. Sergeyev, Sergeyev presented the grossone approach in the book Arithmetic of Infinity and in subsequent papers on numerical computation with infinite and infinitesimal quantities. A central principle of the approach is that "the part is less than the whole", applied not only to finite sets and finite quantities but also to infinite sets and processes. This contrasts with standard Cantorian set theory, in which the set of natural numbers and the set of even natural numbers have the same size, namely ℵ_{0}, because they can be placed in bijection. In the grossone framework, by contrast, the natural numbers are assigned ① elements: as ① functions with the properties of a natural number, the even natural numbers and odd natural numbers are each assigned ①/2 elements.

== Definition and notation ==
Grossone is denoted by the circled numeral ①. Sergeyev introduces it through the Infinite Unit Axiom, usually summarized in three parts:

- Infinity: every finite natural number n is less than grossone, i.e. n < ①.
- Identity: ① satisfies identities such as 0·① = 0, ① − ① = 0, ①/① = 1, ①^{0} = 1, 1^{①} = 1, and 0^{①} = 0.
- Divisibility: for every finite positive integer n, the arithmetic progressions N_{k,n} = {k, k + n, k + 2n, …}, where 1 ≤ k ≤ n, are treated as n equal parts of ℕ, each containing ①/n elements.

In this framework, ① is treated as larger than every finite natural number and is often represented as the final element of the sequence of natural numbers:

1, 2, 3, …, ① − 2, ① − 1, ①.

This differs from the usual treatment of ℕ in standard set theory, where the natural numbers have no greatest element.

== Interpretations ==
=== Infinite-unit interpretation ===
In Sergeyev's original presentation, grossone is introduced as an infinite unit of measure, namely the number of elements of the set ℕ of natural numbers. Sergeyev states that ① is not Cantor's cardinal number ℵ_{0} and not the ordinal number ω, but is instead a new numeral with both cardinal and ordinal features analogous to those of finite natural numbers.

In this interpretation, the natural numbers can be written in the form

ℕ = {1, 2, 3, …, ①}

where ① is treated as the largest element of ℕ in the grossone numeral system. Sergeyev also distinguishes ℕ from an extended set of natural numbers containing expressions such as ① + 1, ①^{2}, and higher grossone-based numerals. Thus, in Sergeyev's system, ① is not an absolute largest number in all grossone arithmetic, but the grossone-number of elements of the ordinary natural numbers as represented in that system.

=== Generic finite interpretation ===
Louis Kauffman proposed a different interpretation of grossone notation in terms of the generic finite. In this interpretation, ① is not treated as a completed infinite natural number, but as a symbolic endpoint of an arbitrary finite initial segment. Kauffman writes that

N = {1, 2, 3, …, ① − 2, ① − 1, ①}

is not an infinite set, but a symbolic structure representing a generic finite set.

On Kauffman's reading, ① is not itself a particular natural number, but it can be treated as a generic natural number in finite formulas. For any finite realization of ①, the symbol ① represents the highest element of that realization; in this sense it may be regarded as larger than any particular integer named in advance. Kauffman describes this as a relaxation of Sergeyev's original approach, since the generic-finite reading does not require ① to have all the divisibility properties postulated in Sergeyev's theory, such as being divisible by every finite positive integer.

Kauffman formulates a transfer principle for this interpretation: a statement P(①) involving ① is taken as true when there is a natural number N such that P(n) is true for all finite natural numbers n > N. This permits grossone notation to be used as a way of writing finite formulas with an indefinitely large symbolic endpoint, without interpreting the underlying object as a Cantorian completed infinite set.

The generic finite interpretation is therefore distinct both from ordinary Cantorian set theory and from Sergeyev's original infinite-unit interpretation. It treats grossone notation as a formal device for reasoning about arbitrary finite structures and their limiting behavior, rather than as a commitment to completed infinite sets.

== Relation to other theories of infinity ==
Grossone is distinct from the standard cardinal ℵ_{0} and ordinal ω used in set theory. Sergeyev argues that these symbols belong to different mathematical languages and should not be conflated with ①.

The relationship between grossone and non-standard analysis has been controversial. Gutman and Kutateladze argued that Sergeyev's informal grossone theory admits a formalization inside classical non-standard analysis, modeling grossone by ν!, where ν is an infinitely large non-standard natural number. Sergeyev rejected this interpretation and argued that the grossone methodology is independent of non-standard analysis.

Gabriele Lolli gave an axiomatic treatment of grossone in 2015, using a second-order language and predicative second-order logic. Lolli's formalization was not finitely axiomatizable and was shown to be a conservative extension of Peano arithmetic. Franco Montagna, Giulia Simi, and Andrea Sorbi studied related formal systems inspired by grossone, including bounded universes of finite and infinite natural numbers.

== Applications ==
Grossone-based methods have been proposed for a variety of areas in applied mathematics and computation. Sergeyev's 2017 survey discussed proposed applications to infinite sets, divergent series, probability, fractals, numerical differentiation, ordinary differential equations, and optimization.

In mathematical programming and operations research, Sonia De Cosmis and Renato De Leone proposed uses of grossone in anti-cycling procedures for the simplex method and in exact differentiable penalty functions for nonlinear programming. Louis D'Alotto applied the Infinite Unit Axiom and grossone to the classification of one-dimensional cellular automata.

In optimization, Marco Cococcioni, Massimo Pappalardo, and Sergeyev proposed a grossone-based method for lexicographic multi-objective linear programming. Later work by Cococcioni and collaborators proposed a cutting-plane method for lexicographic multi-objective integer linear programming using the grossone methodology. Grossone-based numerical methods have also been proposed for other optimization problems, including nonlinear programming and exact penalty methods, sparse classification, bundle methods, multi-objective evolutionary optimization, and global optimization. Cristian S. Calude and Monica Dumitrescu used a grossone-inspired formalism to study infinitesimal probabilities on infinite sets of positive integers.

Grossone-based methods have also been applied to questions concerning computability. In particular, they have been used to reconsider diagonalization arguments and to distinguish between Turing machines with infinite tapes of different lengths within the grossone framework.

=== Potential infinity and limits ===
Grossone has been discussed in relation to the traditional distinction between potential infinity and actual infinity, especially in connection with the use of limits. Sergeyev contrasts the ①-based methodology with the ordinary limit-based treatment of infinity: in his account, the d'Alembert–Cauchy concept of limit replaced actual infinite and infinitesimal quantities by potential ones, while grossone notation is intended to allow expressions to be evaluated at specified infinite or infinitesimal points.

Kauffman's generic-finite interpretation gives a different connection with non-completed infinity. Kauffman begins from the stance that there are no completed infinite sets and interprets ① as a symbolic endpoint of an arbitrary finite initial segment, rather than as a Cantorian completed infinite set. On this reading, a formula containing ① can be understood as a finite formula with an unspecified large upper bound. Kauffman states that expressions involving ① can be read as generic finite formulas and, in suitable cases, as indicating the behavior of a corresponding limit or infinite sum.

A related use appears in work on infinite series. Zhigljavsky proposed axioms for using grossone in summation, including a "transition to a limit" principle under which, if a sequence tends to zero as n tends to infinity, the ①-indexed term is infinitesimal. He describes these axioms as making the substitution of ∞ by ① sensible when translating classical summation problems into grossone notation.

These interpretations should not be conflated. In Sergeyev's original methodology, ① is treated as an actual infinite unit of measure. In Kauffman's generic-finite interpretation, by contrast, ① is a symbolic device for reasoning about arbitrary finite structures and their limiting behavior without assuming completed infinite sets.

== Criticism ==
The notion of the grossone has been the subject of both formal study and of criticism. Lolli described Sergeyev's approach as involving elements of realism, formalism, and finitism, while also identifying points requiring clarification or further development. Paul Ernest characterized grossone as a contemporary controversy concerning infinity in mathematical practice, noting both the extent of Sergeyev's publication record and the strength of the criticism directed at the theory.

Gutman and Kutateladze argued that grossone could be formalized inside non-standard analysis and criticized Sergeyev's presentation as unnecessary or imprecise. Gutman, Katz, Kudryk, and Kutateladze later compared grossone with Levi-Civita fields and hyperreal frameworks and argued that any consistent subsystem of Sergeyev's system would be subsumed by existing non-standard methods. Sergeyev responded to such claims in a 2019 article defending the independence of the grossone methodology from non-standard analysis.

Ernest concluded in 2023 that the value of the grossone approach remained unsettled and that no decisive problem had yet been solved by it that could not be solved by existing methods.

== See also ==
- Aleph number
- Cardinal number
- Hilbert's paradox of the Grand Hotel
- Hyperreal number
- Infinitesimal
- Non-standard analysis
- Numeral system
- Ordinal number
- Imaginary numbers
- Surreal number
- Transfinite number
