= Mikhail Goussarov =

Russian mathematician

Mikhail Goussarov (March 8, 1958, Leningrad – June 25, 1999, Tel Aviv) was a Soviet mathematician who worked in low-dimensional topology. He and Victor Vassiliev independently discovered finite type invariants of knots and links. He drowned at the age of 41 in an accident in Tel Aviv, Israel.

== See also ==
- Memorial page maintained by Dror Bar-Natan.
