= Laurent polynomial =

Polynomial with negative exponents

In mathematics, a Laurent polynomial (named after Pierre Alphonse Laurent) in one variable over a field $\mathbb{F}$ is a linear combination of positive and negative powers of the variable with coefficients in $\mathbb{F}$. Laurent polynomials in $X$ form a ring denoted $\mathbb{F}[X, X^{-1}]$. They differ from ordinary polynomials in that they may have terms of negative degree. The construction of Laurent polynomials may be iterated, leading to the ring of Laurent polynomials in several variables. Laurent polynomials are of particular importance in the study of complex variables.

== Definition ==
A Laurent polynomial with coefficients in a field $\mathbb{F}$ is an expression of the form

$$p = \sum_{k\in\mathbb{Z}} p_k X^k, \quad p_k \in \mathbb{F}$$

where $X$ is a formal variable, and only finitely many coefficients $p_{k}$ are non-zero. Two Laurent polynomials are equal if their coefficients are equal. Such expressions can be added, multiplied, and brought back to the same form by reducing similar terms. Formulas for addition and multiplication are exactly the same as for the ordinary polynomials, with the only difference that both positive and negative powers of $X$ can be present:

$$\bigg(\sum_i a_i X^i\bigg) + \bigg(\sum_i b_i X^i\bigg) =
\sum_i (a_i+b_i)X^i$$

and

$$\bigg(\sum_i a_i X^i\bigg) \cdot \bigg(\sum_j b_j X^j\bigg) =
\sum_k \Bigg(\sum_{i,j \atop i+j=k} a_i b_j\Bigg)X^k.$$

Since only finitely many coefficients $a_{i}$ and $b_{j}$ are non-zero, all sums in effect have only finitely many terms, and hence represent Laurent polynomials.

== Properties ==
- A Laurent polynomial over $\mathbb{C}$ may be viewed as a Laurent series in which only finitely many coefficients are non-zero.
- The ring of Laurent polynomials $R\left [X, X^{-1} \right ]$ is an extension of the polynomial ring $R[X]$ obtained by "inverting $X$". More rigorously, it is the localization of the polynomial ring in the multiplicative set consisting of the powers of $X$. Many properties of the Laurent polynomial ring follow from the general properties of localization.
- The ring of Laurent polynomials is a subring of the rational functions.
- The ring of Laurent polynomials over a field is Noetherian (but not Artinian).
- If $R$ is an integral domain, the units of the Laurent polynomial ring $R\left [X, X^{-1} \right ]$ have the form $uX^{k}$, where $u$ is a unit of $R$ and $k$ is an integer. In particular, if $K$ is a field then the units of $K[X, X^{-1}]$ have the form $aX^{k}$, where $a$ is a non-zero element of $K$.
- The Laurent polynomial ring $R[X, X^{-1}]$ is isomorphic to the group ring of the group $\mathbb{Z}$ of integers over $R$. More generally, the Laurent polynomial ring in $n$ variables is isomorphic to the group ring of the free abelian group of rank $n$. It follows that the Laurent polynomial ring can be endowed with a structure of a commutative, cocommutative Hopf algebra.

== See also ==
- Jones polynomial
