= Kurt Reidemeister =

German mathematician (1893–1971)

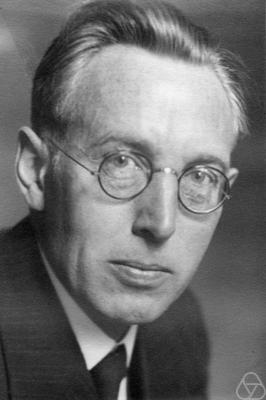
- Reidemeister, c. 1930
- Born: Kurt Werner Friedrich Reidemeister; 13 October 1893; Braunschweig, German Empire
- Died: 8 July 1971 (aged 77); Göttingen, West Germany
- Education: University of Hamburg
- Spouse: Elisabeth Wagner
- Scientific career
- Fields: Mathematics
- Thesis: Über die Relativklassenzahl gewisser relativ-quadratischer Zahlkörper (1921)
- Doctoral advisor: Erich Hecke
- Doctoral students: Günter Hotz; Heiner Zieschang

Kurt Werner Friedrich Reidemeister (13 October 1893 – 8 July 1971) was a mathematician born in Braunschweig (Brunswick), Germany.

== Life ==
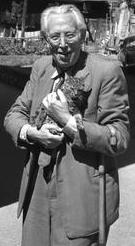
Reidemeister in the late 1950s

He was a brother of Marie Neurath. Beginning in 1912, he studied in Freiburg, Munich, Marburg, and Göttingen. In 1920, he got the Staatsexamen (master's degree) in mathematics, philosophy, physics, chemistry, and geology. He received his doctorate in 1921 with a thesis in algebraic number theory at the University of Hamburg under the supervision of Erich Hecke.

He became interested in differential geometry; he edited Wilhelm Blaschke's second volume on the topic, and both made an acclaimed contribution to the Jena DMV conference in September 1921.

In October 1922 or 1923 he was appointed assistant professor at the University of Vienna. While there he became familiar with the work of Wilhelm Wirtinger on knot theory, and became closely connected to Hans Hahn and the Vienna Circle. Its 1929 manifesto lists one of Reidemeister's publications in a bibliography of closely related authors.

In 1925 he became a full professor at the University of Königsberg; he stayed until 1933, when he was regarded politically unsound by the Nazis and dismissed from his position. Whilst there he organised the Second Conference on the Epistemology of the Exact Sciences in conjunction with journal Erkenntnis.

Blaschke managed to get a promise about Reidemeister's reappointment, and in autumn 1934 he got the chair of Kurt Hensel at the University of Marburg. He stayed there, except for a visit to the Princeton Institute for Advanced Study in 1948–1950, until he got appointed to Göttingen University in 1955, where he stayed until his emeritation.

== Works ==
Reidemeister's interests were mainly in combinatorial group theory, combinatorial topology, geometric group theory, and the foundations of geometry. His works include Knoten und Gruppen (1926), Einführung in die kombinatorische Topologie (1932), and Knotentheorie (1932). He co-edited the journal Mathematische Annalen from 1947 until 1963. He was also a philosopher. His book "Das exakte Denken der Griechen" (1949) is not as well known as his mathematical work. In it he remarks that mathematical thought is "just the beginning of thought".

== See also ==
- Reidemeister moves
- Reidemeister–Singer theorem
- Reidemeister torsion
