= Vortex theory of the atom =

Incorrect but seminal physical theory

The vortex theory of the atom was a 19th-century attempt by William Thomson (later Lord Kelvin) to explain why the atoms recently discovered by chemists came in only relatively few varieties but in very great numbers of each kind. Based on the idea of stable, knotted vortices in the ether or aether, it contributed an important mathematical legacy.

== Description ==
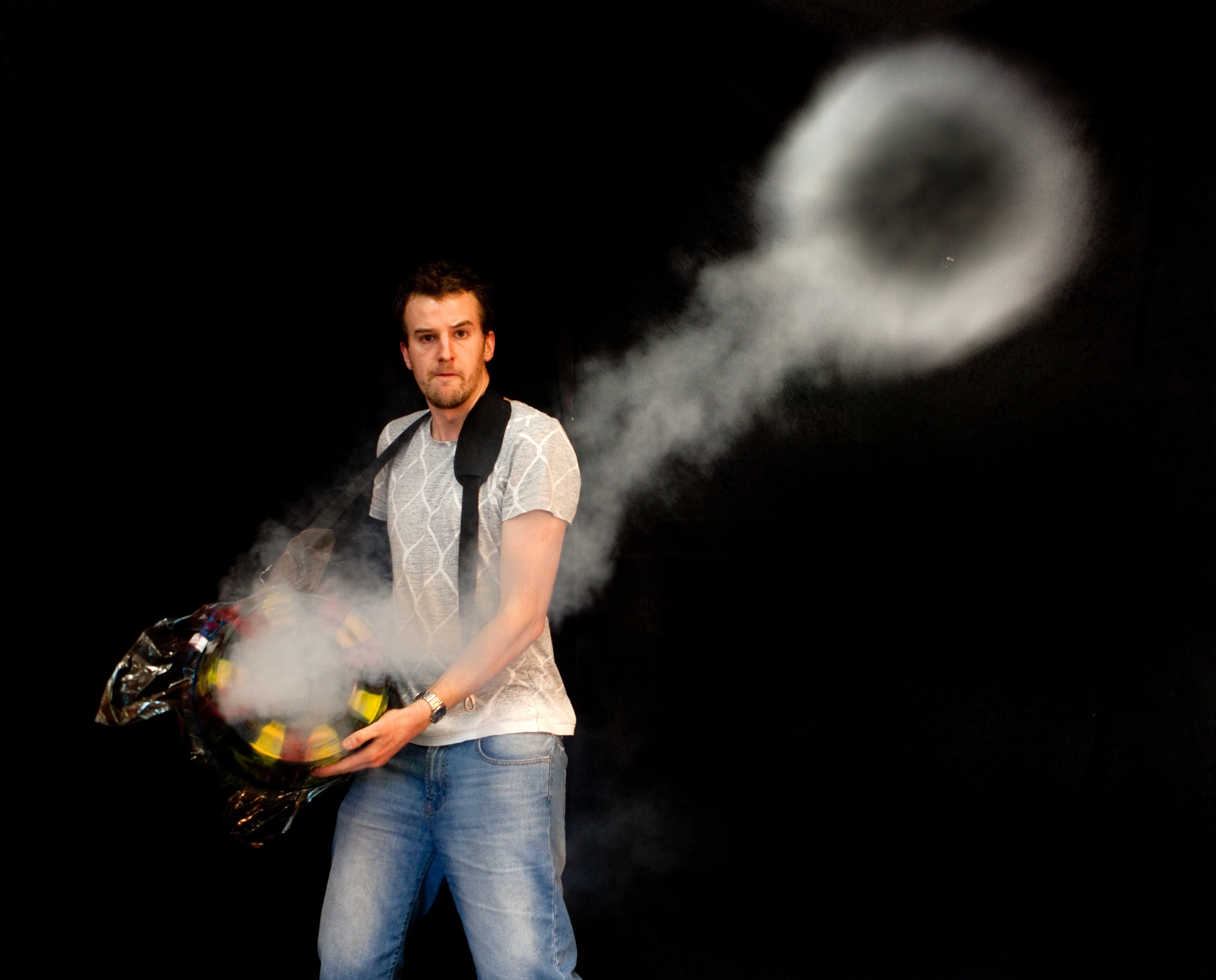
A smoke ring demonstration. A smoke ring demonstration by Peter Guthrie Tait in 1867 led William Thomson to connect a hydrodynamic theory of Hermann Helmholtz to atomic theory.

The vortex theory of the atom was based on the observation that a stable vortex can be created in a fluid by making it into a ring with no ends. Such vortices could be sustained in the luminiferous aether, a hypothetical fluid thought at the time to pervade all of space. In the vortex theory of the atom, a chemical atom is modelled by such a vortex in the aether.

Knots can be tied in the core of such a vortex, leading to the hypothesis that each chemical element corresponds to a different kind of knot. The simple toroidal vortex, represented by the circular "unknot" 0_{1}, was thought to represent hydrogen. Many elements had yet to be discovered, so the next knot, the trefoil knot 3_{1}, was thought to represent carbon.

== History ==
Between 1870 and 1890 the vortex atom theory, which hypothesised that an atom was a vortex in the aether, was popular among British physicists and mathematicians. William Thomson, who became better known as Lord Kelvin, first conjectured that atoms might be vortices in the aether that pervades space. About 60 scientific papers were subsequently written on it by approximately 25 scientists.

=== Origins ===
In the seventeenth century Descartes developed a theory of vortex motion to explain such things as why light radiated in all directions and the planets moved in circular orbits. He believed that there was no vacuum and any object which moved had to be entering a gap left by another moving object. He realised that a circular chain of such objects, all replacing each other, would enable such movement. Thus, all movement consisted of endless circular vortices at all scales. However Descartes model consisted of tiny whirling particles rather than a strictly continuous medium of the vortex theory of atoms.

Hermann Helmholtz, working on the hydrodynamics of idealized fluids, realized in the mid-19th century that the core of a vortex, analogous to the eye of a hurricane, is a line-like filament and in a perfect frictionless fluid these filaments can form closed rings. Helmholtz also showed that vortices exert forces on one another, and those forces take a form analogous to the magnetic forces between electrical wires. However Helmholtz made no connection theories of matter.

During the intervening period, chemist John Dalton had developed his atomic theory of matter. It remained only to bring the two strands of discovery together.

=== William Thomson (Lord Kelvin) ===
William Thomson, later to become Lord Kelvin, became concerned with the nature of Dalton's chemical elements, whose atoms appeared in only a few forms but in vast numbers. He was inspired by Helmholtz's findings, reasoning that the aether, a substance then hypothesised to pervade all of space, should be capable of supporting such stable vortices. According to Helmholtz's theorems, these vortices would correspond to different kinds of knot. Thomson suggested that each type of knot might represent an atom of a different chemical element. He further speculated that multiple knots might aggregate into molecules of somewhat lower stability.

He published his paper "On Vortex Atoms" in the Proceedings of the Royal Society of Edinburgh in 1867.

=== Peter Tait ===
The knots with up to 7 crossings.

Thomson's colleague Peter Guthrie Tait was attracted by the vortex atom theory and undertook a pioneering study of knots, producing a systematic classification of those with up to 10 crossings, in the hope of thus systematizing the various elements.

=== J. J. Thomson ===
J. J. Thomson took up the challenge in his 1883 Master's degree thesis, a Treatise on the motion of vortex rings. In it, Thomson developed a mathematical treatment of the motions of William Thomson and Peter Tait's atoms.

When Thomson later discovered the electron (for which he received a Nobel Prize), he abandoned his "nebular atom" hypothesis based on the vortex atomic theory, in favour of his plum pudding model.

=== Demise ===
By 1883 William Thomson began to see that the theory could not do all of the things he hoped. It could not explain inertia or gravitation and, worse Helmholtz's circular ring was not ultimately stable. Even the properties of crystals, and of electrical and chemical forces were unexplainable in the model. However, in an era with increasing evidence for atomic theory and no viable alternative model, the vortex theory was highly influential.

=== Legacy ===
Tait's work especially founded the branch of topology called knot theory, with J. J. Thomson providing some early mathematical advancements. The vortex theory was not successful as a model for the atom, but the theoretical development of the theory had a lasting impact on theoretical hydrodynamics. In 1961, inspired by Kelvin's motivation and results, Tony Skyrme introduced solitons to build a model for nucleons. These solitons were topologically stable vortices of a 'pion fluid' and were later called skyrmions.

== See also ==
- Loop quantum gravity
- Magnetic skyrmion, a vortex-like magnetic quasiparticle
- Quantum vortex, a quantised flux circulation
- Toroidal ring model of elementary particles
