= Chern–Simons theory =

Topological quantum field theory

The Chern–Simons theory is a 3-dimensional topological quantum field theory of Schwarz type. It was discovered first by mathematical physicist Albert Schwarz. It is named after mathematicians Shiing-Shen Chern and James Harris Simons, who introduced the Chern–Simons 3-form. In the Chern–Simons theory, the action is proportional to the integral of the Chern–Simons 3-form.

In condensed-matter physics, Chern–Simons theory describes composite fermions and the topological order in fractional quantum Hall effect states. In mathematics, it has been used to calculate knot invariants and three-manifold invariants such as the Jones polynomial.

Particularly, Chern–Simons theory is specified by a choice of simple Lie group G known as the gauge group of the theory and also a number referred to as the level of the theory, which is a constant that multiplies the action. The action is gauge dependent, however the partition function of the quantum theory is well-defined when the level is an integer and the gauge field strength vanishes on all boundaries of the 3-dimensional spacetime.

It is also the central mathematical object in theoretical models for topological quantum computers (TQC). Specifically, an SU(2) Chern–Simons theory describes the simplest non-abelian anyonic model of a TQC, the Yang–Lee–Fibonacci model.

The dynamics of Chern–Simons theory on the 2-dimensional boundary of a 3-manifold is closely related to fusion rules and conformal blocks in conformal field theory, and in particular WZW theory.

== The classical theory ==
=== Mathematical origin ===
In the 1940s S. S. Chern and A. Weil studied the global curvature properties of smooth manifolds M as de Rham cohomology (Chern–Weil theory), which is an important step in the theory of characteristic classes in differential geometry. Given a flat G-principal bundle P on M there exists a unique homomorphism, called the Chern–Weil homomorphism, from the algebra of G-adjoint invariant polynomials from g (the Lie algebra of G) to the cohomology $H^*(M,\mathbb{R})$. If the invariant polynomial is homogeneous one can write down concretely any k-form of the closed connection ω as some 2k-form of the associated curvature form Ω of ω.

In 1974 S. S. Chern and J. H. Simons had concretely constructed a (2k − 1)-form df(ω) such that

$$dTf(\omega)=f(\Omega^k),$$

where T is the Chern–Weil homomorphism. This form is called Chern–Simons form. If df(ω) is closed one can integrate the above formula

$$Tf(\omega)=\int_C f(\Omega^k),$$

where C is a (2k − 1)-dimensional cycle on M. This invariant is called Chern–Simons invariant. As pointed out in the introduction of the Chern–Simons paper, the Chern–Simons invariant CS(M) is the boundary term that cannot be determined by any pure combinatorial formulation. It also can be defined as

$$\operatorname{CS}(M)=\int_{s(M)}\tfrac{1}{2}Tp_1\in\mathbb{R}/\mathbb{Z},$$

where $p_1$ is the first Pontryagin number and s(M) is the section of the normal orthogonal bundle P. Moreover, the Chern–Simons term is described as the eta invariant defined by Atiyah, Patodi and Singer.

The gauge invariance and the metric invariance can be viewed as the invariance under the adjoint Lie group action in the Chern–Weil theory. The action integral (path integral) of the field theory in physics is viewed as the Lagrangian integral of the Chern–Simons form and Wilson loop, holonomy of vector bundle on M. These explain why the Chern–Simons theory is closely related to topological field theory.

=== Configurations ===
Chern–Simons theories can be defined on any topological 3-manifold M, with or without boundary. As these theories are Schwarz-type topological theories, no metric needs to be introduced on M.

Chern–Simons theory is a gauge theory, which means that a classical configuration in the Chern–Simons theory on M with gauge group G is described by a principal G-bundle on M. The connection of this bundle is characterized by a connection one-form A which is valued in the Lie algebra g of the Lie group G. In general the connection A is only defined on individual coordinate patches, and the values of A on different patches are related by maps known as gauge transformations. These are characterized by the assertion that the covariant derivative, which is the sum of the exterior derivative operator d and the connection A, transforms in the adjoint representation of the gauge group G. The square of the covariant derivative with itself can be interpreted as a g-valued 2-form F called the curvature form or field strength. It also transforms in the adjoint representation.

=== Dynamics ===
The action S of Chern–Simons theory is proportional to the integral of the Chern–Simons 3-form

$$S=\frac{k}{4\pi}\int_M \text{tr}\,(A\wedge dA+\tfrac{2}{3}A\wedge A\wedge A).$$

The constant k is called the level of the theory. The classical physics of Chern–Simons theory is independent of the choice of level k.

Classically the system is characterized by its equations of motion which are the extrema of the action with respect to variations of the field A. In terms of the field curvature

$$F = dA + A \wedge A \,$$

the field equation is explicitly

$$0=\frac{\delta S}{\delta A}=\frac{k}{2\pi} F.$$

The classical equations of motion are therefore satisfied if and only if the curvature vanishes everywhere, in which case the connection is said to be flat. Thus the classical solutions to G Chern–Simons theory are the flat connections of principal G-bundles on M. Flat connections are determined entirely by holonomies around noncontractible cycles on the base M. More precisely, they are in one-to-one correspondence with equivalence classes of homomorphisms from the fundamental group of M to the gauge group G up to conjugation.

If M has a boundary N then there is additional data which describes a choice of trivialization of the principal G-bundle on N. Such a choice characterizes a map from N to G. The dynamics of this map is described by the Wess–Zumino–Witten (WZW) model on N at level k.

== Quantization ==
To canonically quantize Chern–Simons theory one defines a state on each 2-dimensional surface Σ in M. As in any quantum field theory, the states correspond to rays in a Hilbert space. There is no preferred notion of time in a Schwarz-type topological field theory and so one can require that Σ be a Cauchy surface, in fact, a state can be defined on any surface.

Σ is of codimension one, and so one may cut M along Σ. After such a cutting M will be a manifold with boundary and in particular classically the dynamics of Σ will be described by a WZW model. Witten has shown that this correspondence holds even quantum mechanically. More precisely, he demonstrated that the Hilbert space of states is always finite-dimensional and can be canonically identified with the space of conformal blocks of the G WZW model at level k.

For example, when Σ is a 2-sphere, this Hilbert space is one-dimensional and so there is only one state. When Σ is a 2-torus the states correspond to the integrable representations of the affine Lie algebra corresponding to g at level k. Characterizations of the conformal blocks at higher genera are not necessary for Witten's solution of Chern–Simons theory.

== Observables ==
=== Wilson loops ===
The observables of Chern–Simons theory are the n-point correlation functions of gauge-invariant operators. The most often studied class of gauge invariant operators are Wilson loops. A Wilson loop is the holonomy around a loop in M, traced in a given representation R of G. As we will be interested in products of Wilson loops, without loss of generality we may restrict our attention to irreducible representations R.

More concretely, given an irreducible representation R and a loop K in M, one may define the Wilson loop $W_R(K)$ by

$$W_R(K) =\operatorname{Tr}_R \, \mathcal{P} \exp\left(i \oint_K A\right)$$

where A is the connection 1-form and we take the Cauchy principal value of the contour integral and $\mathcal{P} \exp$ is the path-ordered exponential.

=== HOMFLY and Jones polynomials ===
Consider a link L in M, which is a collection of ℓ disjoint loops. A particularly interesting observable is the ℓ-point correlation function formed from the product of the Wilson loops around each disjoint loop, each traced in the fundamental representation of G. One may form a normalized correlation function by dividing this observable by the partition function Z(M), which is just the 0-point correlation function.

In the special case in which M is the 3-sphere, Witten has shown that these normalized correlation functions are proportional to known knot polynomials. For example, in G = U(N) Chern–Simons theory at level k the normalized correlation function is, up to a phase, equal to

$$\frac{\sin(\pi/(k+N))}{\sin(\pi N/(k+N))}$$

times the HOMFLY polynomial. In particular when N = 2 the HOMFLY polynomial reduces to the Jones polynomial. In the SO(N) case, one finds a similar expression with the Kauffman polynomial.

The phase ambiguity reflects the fact that, as Witten has shown, the quantum correlation functions are not fully defined by the classical data. The linking number of a loop with itself enters into the calculation of the partition function, but this number is not invariant under small deformations and in particular, is not a topological invariant. This number can be rendered well defined if one chooses a framing for each loop, which is a choice of preferred nonzero normal vector at each point along which one deforms the loop to calculate its self-linking number. This procedure is an example of the point-splitting regularization procedure introduced by Paul Dirac and Rudolf Peierls to define apparently divergent quantities in quantum field theory in 1934.

Sir Michael Atiyah has shown that there exists a canonical choice of 2-framing, which is generally used in the literature today and leads to a well-defined linking number. With the canonical framing the above phase is the exponential of 2πi/(k + N) times the linking number of L with itself.

Problem (Extension of Jones polynomial to general 3-manifolds)

"The original Jones polynomial was defined for 1-links in the 3-sphere (the 3-ball, the 3-space R3). Can you define the Jones polynomial for 1-links in any 3-manifold?"

See section 1.1 of this paper for the background and the history of this problem. Kauffman submitted a solution in the case of the product manifold of closed oriented surface and the closed interval, by introducing virtual 1-knots. It is open in the other cases. Witten's path integral for Jones polynomial is written for links in any compact 3-manifold formally, but the calculus is not done even in physics level in any case other than the 3-sphere (the 3-ball, the 3-space R^{3}). This problem is also open in physics level. In the case of Alexander polynomial, this problem is solved.

== Relationships with other theories ==
=== Topological string theories ===
In the context of string theory, a U(N) Chern–Simons theory on an oriented Lagrangian 3-submanifold M of a 6-manifold X arises as the string field theory of open strings ending on a D-brane wrapping X in the A-model topological string theory on X. The B-model topological open string field theory on the spacefilling worldvolume of a stack of D5-branes is a 6-dimensional variant of Chern–Simons theory known as holomorphic Chern–Simons theory.

=== WZW and matrix models ===
Chern–Simons theories are related to many other field theories. For example, if one considers a Chern–Simons theory with gauge group G on a manifold with boundary then all of the 3-dimensional propagating degrees of freedom may be gauged away, leaving a two-dimensional conformal field theory known as a G Wess–Zumino–Witten model on the boundary. In addition the U(N) and SO(N) Chern–Simons theories at large N are well approximated by matrix models.

=== Chern–Simons gravity theory ===
In 1982, S. Deser, R. Jackiw and S. Templeton proposed the Chern–Simons gravity theory in three dimensions, in which the Einstein–Hilbert action in gravity theory is modified by adding the Chern–Simons term. (Deser, Jackiw & Templeton (1982))

In 2003, R. Jackiw and S. Y. Pi extended this theory to four dimensions (Jackiw & Pi (2003)) and Chern–Simons gravity theory has some considerable effects not only to fundamental physics but also condensed matter theory and astronomy.

The four-dimensional case is very analogous to the three-dimensional case. In three dimensions, the gravitational Chern–Simons term is

$$\operatorname{CS}(\Gamma)=\frac{1}{2\pi^2}\int d^3x\varepsilon^{ijk}\biggl(\Gamma^p_{iq}\partial_j\Gamma^q_{kp}+\frac{2}{3}\Gamma^p_{iq}\Gamma^q_{jr}\Gamma^r_{kp}\biggr).$$

This variation gives the Cotton tensor

$$=-\frac{1}{2\sqrt{g}}\bigl(\varepsilon^{mij}D_i R^n_j+\varepsilon^{nij}D_i R^m_j).$$

Then, Chern–Simons modification of three-dimensional gravity is made by adding the above Cotton tensor to the field equation, which can be obtained as the vacuum solution by varying the Einstein–Hilbert action.

=== Chern–Simons matter theories ===
In 2013 Kenneth A. Intriligator and Nathan Seiberg solved these 3d Chern–Simons gauge theories and their phases using monopoles carrying extra degrees of freedom. The Witten index of the many vacua discovered was computed by compactifying the space by turning on mass parameters and then computing the index. In some vacua, supersymmetry was computed to be broken. These monopoles were related to condensed matter vortices. (Intriligator & Seiberg (2013))

The N = 6 Chern–Simons matter theory is the holographic dual of M-theory on $AdS_4\times S_7$.

=== Four-dimensional Chern–Simons theory ===
In 2013 Kevin Costello defined a closely related theory defined on a four-dimensional manifold consisting of the product of a two-dimensional 'topological plane' and a two-dimensional (or one complex dimensional) complex curve. He later studied the theory in more detail together with Witten and Masahito Yamazaki, demonstrating how the gauge theory could be related to many notions in integrable systems theory, including exactly solvable lattice models (like the six-vertex model or the XXZ spin chain), integrable quantum field theories (such as the Gross–Neveu model, principal chiral model and symmetric space coset sigma models), the Yang–Baxter equation and quantum groups such as the Yangian which describe symmetries underpinning the integrability of the aforementioned systems.

The action on the 4-manifold $M = \Sigma \times C$ where $\Sigma$ is a two-dimensional manifold and $C$ is a complex curve is
$$S = \int_M \omega \wedge CS(A)$$
where $\omega$ is a meromorphic one-form on $C$.

== Chern–Simons terms in other theories ==
The Chern–Simons term can also be added to models which aren't topological quantum field theories. In 3D, this gives rise to a massive photon if this term is added to the action of Maxwell's theory of electrodynamics. This term can be induced by integrating over a massive charged Dirac field. It also appears for example in the quantum Hall effect. The addition of the Chern–Simons term to various theories gives rise to vortex- or soliton-type solutions Ten- and eleven-dimensional generalizations of Chern–Simons terms appear in the actions of all ten- and eleven-dimensional supergravity theories.

=== One-loop renormalization of the level ===
If one adds matter to a Chern–Simons gauge theory then, in general it is no longer topological. However, if one adds n Majorana fermions then, due to the parity anomaly, when integrated out they lead to a pure Chern–Simons theory with a one-loop renormalization of the Chern–Simons level by −n/2, in other words the level k theory with n fermions is equivalent to the level k − n/2 theory without fermions.

== See also ==
- Gauge theory (mathematics)
- Chern–Simons form
- Topological quantum field theory
- Alexander polynomial
- Jones polynomial
- 2+1D topological gravity
- Skyrmion
- ∞-Chern–Simons theory
