= Skein relation =

Mathematical tool for studying knots

Skein relations are a mathematical tool used to study knots. A central question in the mathematical theory of knots is whether two knot diagrams represent the same knot. One way to answer the question is using knot polynomials, which are invariants of the knot. If two diagrams have different polynomials, they represent different knots. However, the converse is not true.

Skein relations are often used to give simple definitions of knot polynomials. A skein relation gives a linear relation between the values of a knot polynomial on a collection of three links which differ from each other only in a small region. For some knot polynomials, such as the Conway, Alexander, and Jones polynomials, the relevant skein relations are sufficient to calculate the polynomial recursively.

== Definition ==
A skein relationship requires three link diagrams that are identical except at one crossing. The three diagrams must exhibit the three possibilities that could occur for the two line segments at that crossing, one of the lines could pass under, the same line could be over or the two lines might not cross at all. Link diagrams must be considered because a single skein change can alter a diagram from representing a knot to one representing a link and vice versa. Depending on the knot polynomial in question, the links (or tangles) appearing in a skein relation may be oriented or unoriented.

The three diagrams are labelled as follows. Turn the three link diagram so the directions at the crossing in question are both roughly northward. One diagram will have northwest over northeast, it is labelled L_{−}. Another will have northeast over northwest, it's L_{+}. The remaining diagram is lacking that crossing and is labelled L_{0}.

The labelling is independent of direction insofar as it remains the same if all directions are reversed. Thus polynomials on undirected knots are unambiguously defined by this method. However, the directions on links are a vital detail to retain as one recurses through a polynomial calculation.

It is also sensible to think in a generative sense, by taking an existing link diagram and "patching" it to make the other two—just so long as the patches are applied with compatible directions.

To recursively define a knot (link) polynomial, a function F is fixed and for any triple of diagrams and their polynomials labelled as above,
$$F\Big(L_-,L_0,L_+\Big)=0$$
or more pedantically
$$F\Big(L_-(x),L_0(x),L_+(x),x\Big)=0$$
for all $x$ (Finding an F which produces polynomials independent of the sequences of crossings used in a recursion is no trivial exercise.)

More formally, a skein relation can be thought of as defining the kernel of a quotient map from the planar algebra of tangles. Such a map corresponds to a knot polynomial if all closed diagrams are taken to some (polynomial) multiple of the image of the empty diagram.

== Example ==
Sometime in the early 1960s, Conway showed how to compute the Alexander polynomial using skein relations. As it is recursive, it is not quite so direct as Alexander's original matrix method; on the other hand, parts of the work done for one knot will apply to others. In particular, the network of diagrams is the same for all skein-related polynomials.

Let function P from link diagrams to Laurent series in $\sqrt x$ be such that $P({\rm unknot})=1$ and a triple of skein-relation diagrams $(L_-, L_0, L_+)$ satisfies the equation

$$P(L_-) = (x^{-1/2}-x^{1/2})P(L_0) + P(L_+)$$

Then P maps a knot to one of its Alexander polynomials.

In this example, we calculate the Alexander polynomial of the cinquefoil knot, the alternating knot with five crossings in its minimal diagram. At each stage we exhibit a relationship involving a more complex link and two simpler diagrams. Note that the more complex link is on the right in each step below except the last. For convenience, let A = x^{−1/2}−x^{1/2}.

To begin, we create two new diagrams by patching one of the cinquefoil's crossings (highlighted in yellow) so

P = A × P + P

The second diagram is actually a trefoil; the first diagram is two unknots with four crossings. Patching the latter

P = A × P + P

gives, again, a trefoil, and two unknots with two crossings (the Hopf link ). Patching the trefoil

P = A × P + P

gives the unknot and, again, the Hopf link. Patching the Hopf link

P = A × P + P

gives a link with 0 crossings (unlink) and an unknot. The unlink takes a bit of sneakiness:

P = A × P + P

=== Computations ===
We now have enough relations to compute the polynomials of all the links we've encountered, and can use the above equations in reverse order to work up to the cinquefoil knot itself. The calculation is described in the table below, where ? denotes the unknown quantity we are solving for in each relation:

knot name	diagrams	P (diagram)		
knot name	diagrams	skein equation	?	P in full
unknot		defined as 1		x→1
unlink		1=A?+1	0	x→0
Hopf link		0=A1+?	-A	x→x^{1/2}-x^{−1/2}
trefoil		1=A(-A)+?	1+A^{2}	x→x^{−1}-1+x
4 crossing link		-A=A(1+A^{2})+?	-A(2+A^{2})	x→-x^{−3/2}+x^{−1/2}-x^{1/2}+x^{3/2}
cinquefoil		1+A^{2}=A(-A(2+A^{2}))+?	1+3A^{2}+A^{4}	x→x^{−2}-x^{−1}+1-x+x^{2}

Thus the Alexander polynomial for a cinquefoil is P(x) = x^{−2} -x^{−1} +1 -x +x^{2}.

== Etymology ==
In knot theory, the term skein appears to have been coined by John Conway around 1979, and refers to the unit of measure of yarn in the textiles industry.

== Sources ==
- American Mathematical Society, Knots and Their Polynomials, Feature Column.
- Weisstein, Eric W. "Skein Relationship". MathWorld.
- Morton, Hugh R.; Lukac, Sascha G. (2003), "HOMFLY polynomial of decorated Hopf link", Journal of Knot Theory and Its Ramifications, 12: 395–416, arXiv:math.GT/0108011, doi:10.1142/s0218216503002536.
