= Vaughan Jones =

New Zealand mathematician and Fields Medalist

Sir Vaughan Jones KNZM FRS FRSNZ FAA
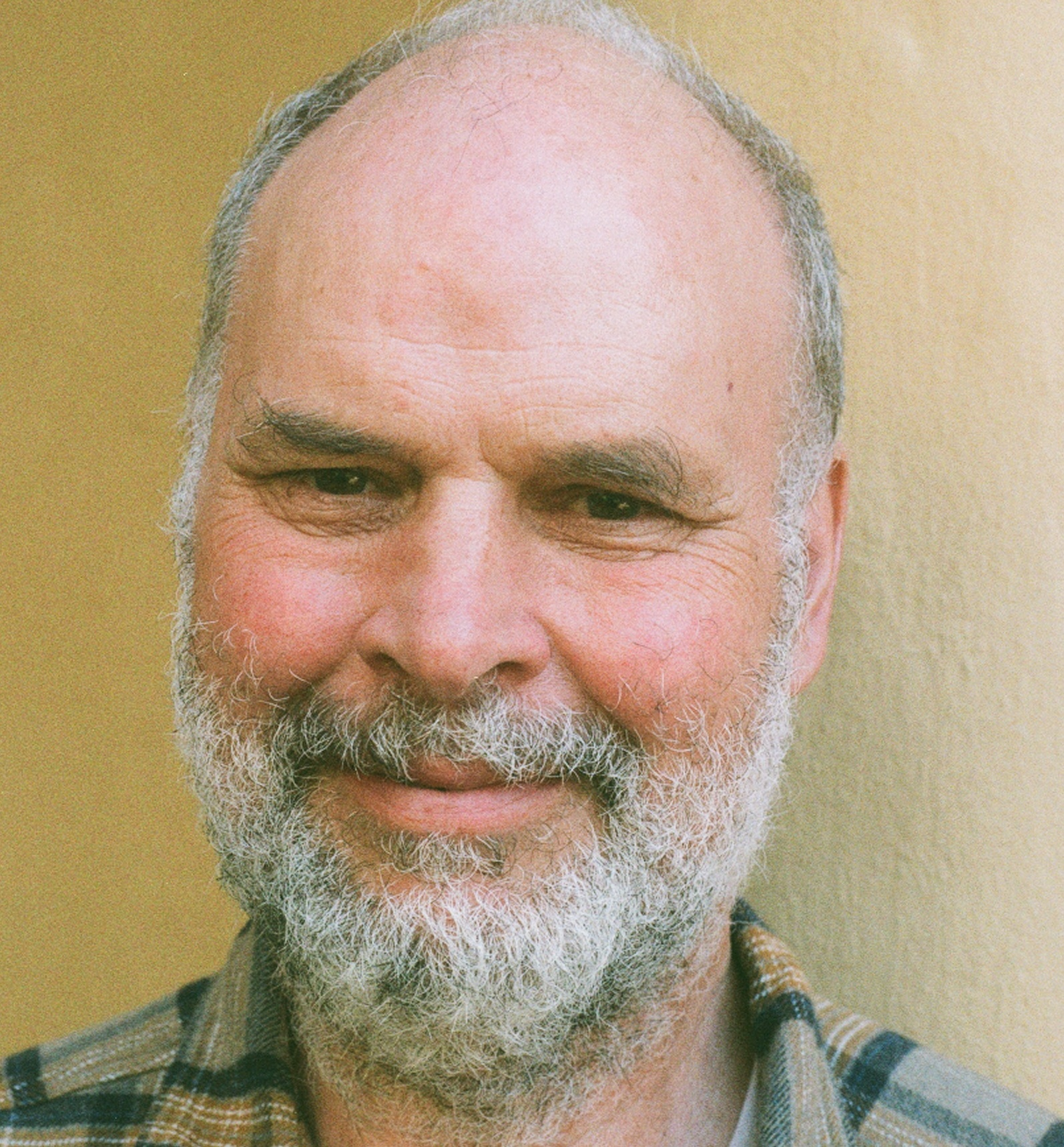
- Jones in 2018
- Born: Vaughan Frederick Randal Jones; 31 December 1952; Gisborne, New Zealand
- Died: 6 September 2020 (aged 67)
- Education: University of Geneva; University of Auckland
- Known for: Jones polynomial Aharonov–Jones–Landau algorithm
- Spouse: Martha Myers
- Awards: Fields Medal (1990)
- Scientific career
- Fields: Von Neumann algebras, knot polynomials, conformal field theory
- Workplaces: University of California, Berkeley; Vanderbilt University; University of California, Los Angeles; University of Pennsylvania
- Doctoral advisor: André Haefliger

Sir Vaughan Frederick Randal Jones (31 December 1952 – 6 September 2020) was a New Zealand mathematician known for his work on von Neumann algebras and knot polynomials. He was awarded a Fields Medal in 1990.

== Early life ==
Jones was born in Gisborne, New Zealand, on 31 December 1952. He was brought up in Cambridge, New Zealand, where he attended St Peter's School. He subsequently transferred to Auckland Grammar School after winning the Gillies Scholarship, and graduated in 1969 from Auckland Grammar. He went on to complete his undergraduate studies at the University of Auckland, obtaining a BSc in 1972 and an MSc in 1973. For his graduate studies, he went to Switzerland where he completed his PhD at the University of Geneva in 1979. His thesis, titled Actions of finite groups on the hyperfinite II_{1} factor, was written under the supervision of André Haefliger, and won him the Vacheron Constantin Prize.

== Career ==
Jones moved to the United States in 1980. There, he taught at the University of California, Los Angeles (1980–1981), and the University of Pennsylvania (1981–1985), before being appointed as professor of mathematics at the University of California, Berkeley. His work on knot polynomials, with the discovery of what is now called the Jones polynomial, was from an unexpected direction with origins in the theory of von Neumann algebras, an area of analysis already much developed by Alain Connes. It led to the solution of a number of classical problems of knot theory, to increased interest in low-dimensional topology, and to the development of quantum topology.

Jones taught at Vanderbilt University as Stevenson Distinguished Professor of mathematics from 2011 until his death. He remained Professor Emeritus at University of California, Berkeley, where he had been on the faculty from 1985 to 2011 and was a Distinguished Alumni Professor at the University of Auckland.

Jones was made an honorary vice-president for life of the International Guild of Knot Tyers in 1992. The Jones Medal, created by the Royal Society of New Zealand in 2010, is named after him.

== Personal life ==
Jones met his wife, Martha Myers, during a ski camp for foreign students while they were studying in Switzerland. She was there as a Fulbright scholar, and subsequently became an associate professor of medicine, health and society. Together, they have three children.

Jones died on 6 September 2020 at age 67 from health complications resulting from a severe ear infection.

Jones was a certified barista.

== Honours and awards ==
- 1990 – awarded the Fields Medal
- 1990 – elected Fellow of the Royal Society
- 1991 – awarded the Rutherford Medal by the Royal Society of New Zealand
- 1991 – awarded the degree of Doctor of Science by the University of Auckland
- 1991 – elected Honorary Fellow of the Royal Society of New Zealand
- 1992 – elected to the Australian Academy of Science as a Corresponding Fellow
- 1992 – awarded a Miller Professorship at the University of California Berkeley
- 2002 – appointed Distinguished Companion of the New Zealand Order of Merit (DCNZM) in the 2002 Queen's Birthday and Golden Jubilee Honours, for services to mathematics
- 2009 – his DCNZM redesignated to a Knight Companion of the New Zealand Order of Merit in the 2009 Special Honours
- 2012 – elected a Fellow of the American Mathematical Society

== Publications ==
- Jones, Vaughan F. R. (1980). "Actions of finite groups on the hyperfinite type II_{1} factor". Memoirs of the American Mathematical Society. doi:10.1090/memo/0237.
- Jones, Vaughan F. R. (1983). "Index for subfactors". Inventiones Mathematicae. 72 (1): 1–25. Bibcode:1983InMat..72....1J. doi:10.1007/BF01389127. MR 0696688. S2CID 121577421.
- Jones, Vaughan F. R. (1985). "A polynomial invariant for knots via von Neumann algebra". Bulletin of the American Mathematical Society. (N.S.). 12: 103–111. doi:10.1090/s0273-0979-1985-15304-2. MR 0766964.
- Jones, Vaughan F. R. (1987). "Hecke algebra representations of braid groups and link polynomials". Annals of Mathematics. (2). 126 (2): 335–388. doi:10.2307/1971403. JSTOR 1971403. MR 0908150.
- Goodman, Frederick M.; de la Harpe, Pierre; Jones, Vaughan F. R. (1989). Coxeter graphs and towers of algebras. Mathematical Sciences Research Institute Publications. Vol. 14. Springer-Verlag. doi:10.1007/978-1-4613-9641-3. ISBN 978-1-4613-9643-7. MR 0999799.
- Jones, Vaughan F. R. (1991). Subfactors and knots. CBMS Regional Conference Series in Mathematics. Vol. 80. Providence, RI: American Mathematical Society. doi:10.1090/cbms/080. ISBN 9780821807293. MR 1134131.
- Jones, Vaughan F. R.; Sunder, Viakalathur Shankar (1997). Introduction to subfactors. London Mathematical Society Lecture Note Series. Vol. 234. Cambridge: Cambridge University Press. doi:10.1017/CBO9780511566219. ISBN 0-521-58420-5. MR 1473221.

== See also ==
- Aharonov–Jones–Landau algorithm
- Planar algebra
- Subfactor
