= Cyclic cover =

In algebraic topology and algebraic geometry, a cyclic cover or cyclic covering is a covering space for which the set of covering transformations forms a cyclic group. As with cyclic groups, there may be both finite and infinite cyclic covers.

Cyclic covers have proven useful in the descriptions of knot topology and the algebraic geometry of Calabi–Yau manifolds.

In classical algebraic geometry, cyclic covers are a tool used to create new objects from existing ones through, for example, a field extension by a root element. The powers of the root element form a cyclic group and provide the basis for a cyclic cover. A line bundle over a complex projective variety with torsion index $r$ may induce a cyclic Galois covering with cyclic group of order $r$.
