= Mikhail Khovanov =

Russian mathematician

- Михаил Гелиевич Хованов
- Born: January 13, 1972 (age 54); Moscow, Soviet Union
- Education: Yale University
- Occupation: Professor of Mathematics
- Employer(s): University of California, Davis; Columbia University; Johns Hopkins University
- Known for: Khovanov homology, categorification
- Notable work: A categorification of the Jones polynomial
- Relatives: Tanya Khovanova (half-sister)
- Website: sites.google.com/view/mkhovanov/

Mikhail Khovanov (Russian: Михаил Гелиевич Хованов; born 13 January 1972) is a Russian professor of mathematics at Johns Hopkins University who works on representation theory, knot theory, and algebraic topology. He is known for introducing Khovanov homology for links, which was one of the first examples of categorification.

== Education and career ==
Khovanov graduated from Moscow State School 57 mathematical class in 1988. He earned a PhD in mathematics from Yale University in 1997, where he studied under Igor Frenkel.

Khovanov was a faculty member at UC Davis before moving to Columbia University.

He is a half-brother of Tanya Khovanova.
