= Journal of Knot Theory and Its Ramifications =

- Discipline: Mathematics
- Language: English
- Edited by: L. H. Kauffman

Publication details
- History: 1992-present
- Publisher: World Scientific (Singapore)
- Impact factor: 0.363 (2016)

Standard abbreviations
- ISO 4: J. Knot Theory Ramif.
- MathSciNet: J. Knot Theory Ramifications

Indexing
- ISSN: 0218-2165 (print); 1793-6527 (web)

Links
- Journal homepage

The Journal of Knot Theory and Its Ramifications was established in 1992 by Louis Kauffman and was the first journal purely devoted to knot theory. It is an interdisciplinary journal covering developments in knot theory, with emphasis on creating connections between with other branches of mathematics and the natural sciences. The journal is published by World Scientific.

According to the Journal Citation Reports, the journal has a 2020 impact factor of 0.379.

== Abstracting and indexing ==
The journal is abstracted and indexed in:

- Science Citation Index
- ISI Alerting Services
- CompuMath Citation Index
- Current Contents/Physical, Chemical & Earth Sciences
- Mathematical Reviews
- Zentralblatt MATH

== See also ==
- History of knot theory
