= HOMFLY polynomial =

Polynomial invariant arising in knot theory

In the mathematical field of knot theory, the HOMFLY polynomial or HOMFLYPT polynomial, sometimes called the generalized Jones polynomial, is a 2-variable knot polynomial, i.e. a knot invariant in the form of a polynomial of variables m and l.

A central question in the mathematical theory of knots is whether two knot diagrams represent the same knot. One tool used to answer such questions is a knot polynomial, which is computed from a diagram of the knot and can be shown to be an invariant of the knot, i.e. diagrams representing the same knot have the same polynomial. The converse may not be true. The HOMFLY polynomial is one such invariant and it generalizes two polynomials previously discovered, the Alexander polynomial and the Jones polynomial, both of which can be obtained by appropriate substitutions from HOMFLY. The HOMFLY polynomial is also a quantum invariant.

The name HOMFLY combines the initials of its co-discoverers: Jim Hoste, Adrian Ocneanu, Kenneth Millett, Peter J. Freyd, W. B. R. Lickorish, and David N. Yetter. The addition of PT recognizes independent work carried out by Józef H. Przytycki and Paweł Traczyk.

== Definition ==
The HOMFLY polynomial is defined recursively using skein relations:

$$P( \mathrm{unknot} ) = 1,\,$$

$$\ell P(L_+) + \ell^{-1}P(L_-) + mP(L_0)=0,\,$$

where $L_+, L_-, L_0$ are links formed by crossing and smoothing changes on a local region of a link diagram, as indicated in the figure.

The HOMFLY polynomial of a link L that is a split union of two links $L_1$ and $L_2$ is given by

$$P(L) = \frac{-(\ell+\ell^{-1})}{m} P(L_1)P(L_2).$$

See the page on skein relation for an example of a computation using such relations.

=== Other skein relations ===
This polynomial can be obtained also using other skein relations:

$$\alpha P(L_+) - \alpha^{-1}P(L_-) = zP(L_0),\,$$
$$xP(L_+) + yP(L_-) + zP(L_0)=0,\,$$

== Main properties ==
$P(L_1 \# L_2)=P(L_1)P(L_2),\,$, where # denotes the knot sum. In other words, the HOMFLY polynomial of a composite knot is the product of the HOMFLY polynomials of its components.

$P_K(\ell,m)=P_{\text{Mirror Image}(K)}(\ell^{-1},m)$, so the HOMFLY polynomial can often be used to distinguish between two knots of different chirality. However there exist chiral pairs of knots that have the same HOMFLY polynomial, e.g. knots 9_{42} and 10_{71} together with their respective mirror images.

The Jones polynomial, V(t), and the Alexander polynomial, $\Delta(t)\,$ can be computed in terms of the HOMFLY polynomial (the version in $\alpha$ and $z$ variables) as follows:

$$V(t)=P(\alpha=t^{-1},z=t^{1/2}-t^{-1/2}),\,$$

$$\Delta(t)=P(\alpha=1,z=t^{1/2}-t^{-1/2}),\,$$

== See also ==
- Alexander polynomial
- Jones polynomial
- Quantum invariant
