= Zoltán Szabó (mathematician) =

Hungarian mathematician

- Born: 24 November 1965 (age 60); Budapest, Hungary
- Education: Eötvös Loránd University (BA); Rutgers University (PhD)
- Known for: Heegaard Floer homology
- Awards: Veblen Prize (2007)
- Scientific career
- Fields: Mathematics
- Workplaces: Princeton University
- Doctoral advisor: Ted Edgar Petrie; John Morgan

Zoltán Szabó (born November 24, 1965) is a professor of mathematics at Princeton University known for his work on Heegaard Floer homology.

== Education and career ==
Szabó received his BA from Eötvös Loránd University in Budapest, Hungary in 1990, and he received his PhD from Rutgers University in 1994.

Together with Peter Ozsváth, Szabó created Heegaard Floer homology, a homology theory for 3-manifolds. For this contribution to the field of topology, Ozsváth and Szabó were awarded the 2007 Oswald Veblen Prize in Geometry. In 2010, he was elected honorary member of the Hungarian Academy of Sciences.

== Selected publications ==
- ———; Ozsváth, Peter (2004), "Holomorphic disks and topological invariants for closed three-manifolds", Annals of Mathematics, 159 (3): 1027–1158, arXiv:math/0101206, doi:10.4007/annals.2004.159.1027, S2CID 119143219.
- ———; Ozsváth, Peter (2004), "Holomorphic disks and three-manifold invariants: properties and applications", Annals of Mathematics, 159 (3): 1159–1245, arXiv:math/0105202, doi:10.4007/annals.2004.159.1159.
- Grid Homology for Knots and Links, American Mathematical Society, (2015)
