= Alexander polynomial =

Knot invariant

In mathematics, the Alexander polynomial is a knot invariant which assigns a polynomial with integer coefficients to each knot type. James Waddell Alexander II discovered this, the first knot polynomial, in 1923. In 1969, John Conway showed a version of this polynomial, now called the Alexander–Conway polynomial, could be computed using a skein relation, although its significance was not realized until the discovery of the Jones polynomial in 1984. Soon after Conway's reworking of the Alexander polynomial, it was realized that a similar skein relation was exhibited in Alexander's paper on his polynomial. (Note: Alexander describes his skein relation toward the end of his paper under the heading "miscellaneous theorems", which is possibly why it got lost. Joan Birman mentions in her paper that Mark Kidwell brought her attention to Alexander's relation in 1970.)

== Definition ==
Let K be a knot in the 3-sphere. Let X be the infinite cyclic cover of the knot complement of K. This covering can be obtained by cutting the knot complement along a Seifert surface of K and gluing together infinitely many copies of the resulting manifold with boundary in a cyclic manner. There is a covering transformation t acting on X. Consider the first homology (with integer coefficients) of X, denoted $H_1(X)$. The transformation t acts on the homology and so we can consider $H_1(X)$ a module over the ring of Laurent polynomials $\mathbb{Z}[t, t^{-1}]$. This is called the Alexander invariant or Alexander module.

The module is finitely presentable; a presentation matrix for this module is called the Alexander matrix. If the number of generators, $r$, is less than or equal to the number of relations, $s$ , then we consider the ideal generated by all $r \times r$ minors of the matrix; this is the zeroth Fitting ideal or Alexander ideal and does not depend on choice of presentation matrix. If $r > s$, set the ideal equal to 0. If the Alexander ideal is principal, take a generator; this is called an Alexander polynomial of the knot. Since this is only unique up to multiplication by the Laurent monomial $\pm t^n$, one often fixes a particular unique form. Alexander's choice of normalization is to make the polynomial have a positive constant term.

Alexander proved that the Alexander ideal is nonzero and always principal. Thus an Alexander polynomial always exists, and is clearly a knot invariant, denoted $\Delta_K(t)$. It turns out that the Alexander polynomial of a knot is the same polynomial for the mirror image knot. In other words, it cannot distinguish between a knot and its mirror image.

== Computing the polynomial ==
The following procedure for computing the Alexander polynomial was given by J. W. Alexander in his paper.

Take an oriented diagram of the knot with $n$ crossings; there are $n+2$ regions of the knot diagram. To work out the Alexander polynomial, first one must create an incidence matrix of size $(n, n + 2)$. The $n$ rows correspond to the $n$ crossings, and the $n+2$ columns to the regions. The values for the matrix entries are either $0,1,-1,t,-t$.

Consider the entry corresponding to a particular region and crossing. If the region is not adjacent to the crossing, the entry is 0. If the region is adjacent to the crossing, the entry depends on its location. The following table gives the entry, determined by the location of the region at the crossing from the perspective of the incoming undercrossing line.

on the left before undercrossing: $-t$
on the right before undercrossing: $1$
on the left after undercrossing: $t$
on the right after undercrossing: $-1$

Remove two columns corresponding to adjacent regions from the matrix, and work out the determinant of the new $n \times n$ matrix. Depending on the columns removed, the answer will differ by multiplication by $\pm t^n$, where the power of $n$ is not necessarily the number of crossings in the knot. To resolve this ambiguity, divide out the largest possible power of $t$ and multiply by $-1$ if necessary, so that the constant term is positive. This gives the Alexander polynomial. For example, this shows immediately that the Alexander polynomial of the unknot is 1 (though this follows also immediately from the definition).

The Alexander polynomial can also be computed from the Seifert matrix.

After the work of J. W. Alexander, Ralph Fox considered a copresentation of the knot group $\pi_1(S^3\backslash K)$, and introduced non-commutative differential calculus, which also permits one to compute $\Delta_K(t)$. (Note: Detailed exposition of this approach about higher Alexander polynomials can be found in Crowell & Fox (1963).)

== Basic properties of the polynomial ==
The Alexander polynomial is symmetric: $\Delta_K(t^{-1}) = \Delta_K(t)$ for all knots K.

From the point of view of the definition, this is an expression of the Poincaré Duality isomorphism $\overline{H_1 X} \simeq \mathrm{Hom}_{\mathbb Z[t,t^{-1}]}(H_1 X, G)$ where $G$ is the quotient of the field of fractions of $\mathbb Z[t,t^{-1}]$ by $\mathbb Z[t,t^{-1}]$, considered as a $\mathbb Z[t,t^{-1}]$-module, and where $\overline{H_1 X}$ is the conjugate $\mathbb Z[t,t^{-1}]$-module to $H_1 X$ ie: as an abelian group it is identical to $H_1 X$ but the covering transformation $t$ acts by $t^{-1}$.

Furthermore, the Alexander polynomial evaluates to a unit on 1: $\Delta_K(1)=\pm 1$.

From the point of view of the definition, this is an expression of the fact that the knot complement is a homology circle, generated by the covering transformation $t$. More generally if $M$ is a 3-manifold such that $rank(H_1 M) = 1$ it has an Alexander polynomial $\Delta_M(t)$ defined as the order ideal of its infinite-cyclic covering space. In this case $\Delta_M(1)$ is, up to sign, equal to the order of the torsion subgroup of $H_1 M$.

The value of the Alexander polynomial evaluated at -1 is known as the determinant of the knot. Every integral Laurent polynomial which is both symmetric and evaluates to a unit at 1 is the Alexander polynomial of a knot.

== Geometric significance of the polynomial ==
Since the Alexander ideal is principal, $\Delta_K(t)=1$ if and only if the commutator subgroup of the knot group is perfect (i.e. equal to its own commutator subgroup).

For a topologically slice knot, the Alexander polynomial satisfies the Fox–Milnor condition $\Delta_K(t) = f(t)f(t^{-1})$ where $f(t)$ is some other integral Laurent polynomial.

Twice the knot genus is bounded below by the degree of the Alexander polynomial.

Michael Freedman proved that a knot in the 3-sphere is topologically slice; i.e., bounds a "locally-flat" topological disc in the 4-ball, if the Alexander polynomial of the knot is trivial.

Kauffman describes the first construction of the Alexander polynomial via state sums derived from physical models. A survey of these topics and other connections with physics are given in.

There are other relations with surfaces and smooth 4-dimensional topology. For example, under certain assumptions, there is a way of modifying a smooth 4-manifold by performing a surgery that consists of removing a neighborhood of a two-dimensional torus and replacing it with a knot complement crossed with S^{1}. The result is a smooth 4-manifold homeomorphic to the original, though now the Seiberg–Witten invariant has been modified by multiplication with the Alexander polynomial of the knot.

Knots with symmetries are known to have restricted Alexander polynomials. Nonetheless, the Alexander polynomial can fail to detect some symmetries, such as strong invertibility.

If the knot complement fibers over the circle, then the Alexander polynomial of the knot is known to be monic (the coefficients of the highest and lowest order terms are equal to $\pm 1$). In fact, if $S \to C_K \to S^1$ is a fiber bundle where $C_K$ is the knot complement, let $g : S \to S$ represent the monodromy, then $\Delta_K(t) = {\rm Det}(tI-g_*)$ where $g_*\colon H_1 S \to H_1 S$ is the induced map on homology.

== Relations to satellite operations ==
If a knot $K$ is a satellite knot with pattern knot $K'$ (there exists an embedding $f : S^1 \times D^2 \to S^3$ such that $K=f(K')$, where $S^1 \times D^2 \subset S^3$ is an unknotted solid torus containing $K'$), then $\Delta_K(t) = \Delta_{f(S^1 \times \{0\})}(t^a) \Delta_{K'}(t)$, where $a \in \mathbb Z$ is the integer that represents $K' \subset S^1 \times D^2$ in $H_1(S^1\times D^2) = \mathbb Z$.

Examples: For a connect-sum $\Delta_{K_1 \# K_2}(t) = \Delta_{K_1}(t) \Delta_{K_2}(t)$. If $K$ is an untwisted Whitehead double, then $\Delta_K(t)=\pm 1$.

== Knots with the same Alexander polynomial ==
The Alexander polynomial is not a complete invariant for knots, that is two distinct knots may have the same Alexander polynomial. For example, according to the database KnotInfo there occurs only 212 unique Alexander polynomials among the 250 knots with up to 10 crossings.

The Alexander polynomial does not detect the unknot: there are infinitely many knots which have Alexander polynomial equal to 1. For example, these include every Whitehead double of an untwisted knot. Explicit examples of knots with few crossings having Alexander polynomial 1 are the Conway knot and the Kinoshita–Terasaka knot, both with 11 crossings. In contrast, it is still unknown whether the Jones polynomial (or the stronger HOMFLY polynomial) determines the unknot.

The Alexander polynomial does not detect primeness of a knot, that is, a prime knot may have the same Alexander polynomial as a composite knot. There are many more properties which are not detected by the Alexander polynomial.

== Alexander–Conway polynomial ==
Alexander proved the Alexander polynomial satisfies a skein relation. John Conway later rediscovered this in a different form and showed that the skein relation together with a choice of value on the unknot was enough to determine the polynomial. Conway's version is a polynomial in z with integer coefficients, denoted $\nabla(z)$ and called the Alexander–Conway polynomial (also known as Conway polynomial or Conway–Alexander polynomial).

Suppose we are given an oriented link diagram, where $L_+, L_-, L_0$ are link diagrams resulting from crossing and smoothing changes on a local region of a specified crossing of the diagram, as indicated in the figure.

Here are Conway's skein relations:

- $\nabla(O) = 1$ (where O is any diagram of the unknot)
- $\nabla(L_+) - \nabla(L_-) = z \nabla(L_0)$

The relationship to the standard Alexander polynomial is given by $\Delta_L(t^2) = \nabla_L(t - t^{-1})$. Here $\Delta_L$ must be properly normalized (by multiplication of $\pm t^{n/2}$) to satisfy the skein relation $\Delta(L_+) - \Delta(L_-) = (t^{1/2} - t^{-1/2}) \Delta(L_0)$. Note that this relation gives a Laurent polynomial in t^{1/2}.

See knot theory for an example computing the Conway polynomial of the trefoil.

== Relation to Floer homology ==
Using pseudo-holomorphic curves, Ozsváth-Szabó and Rasmussen associated a bigraded abelian group, called knot Floer homology, to each isotopy class of knots. The graded Euler characteristic of knot Floer homology is the Alexander polynomial. While the Alexander polynomial gives a lower bound on the genus of a knot, Ozsváth-Szabó showed that knot Floer homology detects the genus. Similarly, while the Alexander polynomial gives an obstruction to a knot complement fibering over the circle, Ni showed that knot Floer homology completely determines when a knot complement fibers over the circle. The knot Floer homology groups are part of the Heegaard Floer homology family of invariants; see Floer homology for further discussion.

== Sources ==
- Adams, Colin C. (2004) [1994]. The Knot Book: An elementary introduction to the mathematical theory of knots. American Mathematical Society. ISBN 978-0-8218-3678-1. (accessible introduction utilizing a skein relation approach)
- Alexander, J. W. (1928). "Topological Invariants of Knots and Links" (PDF). Transactions of the American Mathematical Society. 30 (2): 275–306. doi:10.1090/S0002-9947-1928-1501429-1. JSTOR 1989123.
- Birman, Joan (1993). "New points of view in knot theory". Bull. Amer. Math. Soc. N.S. 28 (2): 253–287. arXiv:math/9304209. doi:10.1090/S0273-0979-1993-00389-6.
- Crowell, Richard; Fox, Ralph (1963). Introduction to Knot Theory. Ginn and Co. after 1977 Springer Verlag.
- Fintushel, Ronald; Stern, Ronald J. (October 1998). "Knots, links, and 4-manifolds". Inventiones Mathematicae. 134 (2): 363–400. arXiv:dg-ga/9612014. Bibcode:1998InMat.134..363F. doi:10.1007/s002220050268. ISSN 0020-9910. MR 1650308. S2CID 3752148.
- Fox, Ralph (1961). "A quick trip through knot theory". In Fort, M.K. (ed.). Proceedings of the University of Georgia Topology Institute. Englewood Cliffs. N. J.: Prentice-Hall. pp. 120–167. OCLC 73203715.
- Freedman, Michael H.; Quinn, Frank (1990). Topology of 4-manifolds. Princeton Mathematical Series. Vol. 39. Princeton University Press. ISBN 978-0-691-08577-7.
- Kauffman, Louis (2006) [1983]. Formal Knot Theory. Courier. ISBN 978-0-486-45052-0.
- Kauffman, Louis (2012). Knots and Physics (4th ed.). World Scientific Publishing Company. ISBN 978-981-4383-00-4.
- Kawauchi, Akio (2012) [1996]. A Survey of Knot Theory. Birkhäuser. ISBN 978-3-0348-9227-8. (covers several different approaches, explains relations between different versions of the Alexander polynomial)
- Ni, Yi (2007). "Knot Floer homology detects fibred knots". Inventiones Mathematicae. Invent. Math. 170 (3): 577–608. arXiv:math/0607156. Bibcode:2007InMat.170..577N. doi:10.1007/s00222-007-0075-9. S2CID 119159648.
- Ozsváth, Peter; Szabó, Zoltán (2004). "Holomorphic disks and knot invariants". Advances in Mathematics. 186 (1): 58–116. arXiv:math/0209056. Bibcode:2002math......9056O. doi:10.1016/j.aim.2003.05.001. S2CID 11246611.
- Ozsváth, Peter; Szabó, Zoltán (2004b). "Holomorphic disks and genus bounds". Geometry and Topology. 8 (2004): 311–334. arXiv:math/0311496. doi:10.2140/gt.2004.8.311. S2CID 11374897.
- Rasmussen, Jacob (2003). Floer homology and knot complements (Thesis). Harvard University. p. 6378. arXiv:math/0306378. Bibcode:2003math......6378R.
- Rolfsen, Dale (1990). Knots and Links (2nd ed.). Publish or Perish. ISBN 978-0-914098-16-4. (explains classical approach using the Alexander invariant; knot and link table with Alexander polynomials)
