= Finite type invariant =

Type of invariant in Knot theory

In the mathematical theory of knots, a finite type invariant, or Vassiliev invariant (so named after Victor Anatolyevich Vassiliev), is a knot invariant that can be extended (in a precise manner to be described) to an invariant of certain singular knots that vanishes on singular knots with $m+1$ singularities and does not vanish on some singular knot with $m$ singularities. It is then said to be of type or order m.

Goussarov, and (independently) Joan Birman and Xiao-Song Lin derived the following combinatorial definition of finite type invariant: Let V be a knot invariant. Define V^{1} to be defined on a knot with one transverse singularity.

Consider a knot K to be a smooth embedding of a circle into $\R^3$. Let K' be a smooth immersion of a circle into $\mathbb R^3$ with one transverse double point. Then

$$V^1(K') = V(K_+) - V(K_-)$$,

where $K_+$ is obtained from K by resolving the double point by pushing up one strand above the other, and $K_-$ is obtained similarly by pushing the opposite strand above the other. This can be done for maps with two transverse double points, three transverse double points, etc., by using the above relation. For V to be of finite type means precisely that there must be a positive integer $m$ such that V vanishes on maps with $m+1$ transverse double points.

Furthermore, there is a notion of equivalence of knots with singularities being transverse double points such that V respects this equivalence. There is also a notion of finite type invariant for 3-manifolds.

== Examples ==
The simplest nontrivial Vassiliev invariant of knots is given by the coefficient of the quadratic term of the Alexander–Conway polynomial. It is an invariant of order two. Modulo two, it is equal to the Arf invariant.

Any coefficient of the Kontsevich invariant is a finite type invariant.

The Milnor invariants are finite type invariants of string links.

== Invariants representation ==
Michael Polyak and Oleg Viro gave a description of the first nontrivial invariants of orders 2 and 3 by means of Gauss diagram representations. Mikhail N. Goussarov has proved that all Vassiliev invariants can be represented that way.

== The universal Vassiliev invariant ==
In 1993, Maxim Kontsevich proved the following important theorem about Vassiliev invariants: For every knot one can compute an integral, now called the Kontsevich integral, which is a universal Vassiliev invariant, meaning that every Vassiliev invariant can be obtained from it by an appropriate evaluation. It is not known at present whether the Kontsevich integral, or the totality of Vassiliev invariants, is a complete knot invariant, or even if it detects the unknot. Computation of the Kontsevich integral, which has values in an algebra of chord diagrams, turns out to be rather difficult and has been done only for a few classes of knots up to now. There is no finite-type invariant of degree less than 11 which distinguishes mutant knots.

== See also ==
- Willerton's fish
