= Renzo L. Ricca =

Italian-British applied mathematician

Renzo Ricca
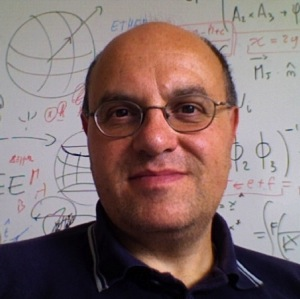
- Renzo L. Ricca (2012)
- Born: January 24, 1960 (age 66)
- Citizenship: Italian & British
- Education: Politecnico di Torino; University of Cambridge
- Scientific career
- Fields: topological fluid dynamics structural complexity vortex dynamics and magnetohydrodynamics
- Workplaces: U. Milano-Bicocca; Beijing University of Technology
- Doctoral advisor: H. Keith Moffatt

Renzo Luigi Ricca (born 24 January 1960) is an Italian applied mathematician (naturalised British citizen), professor of mathematical physics at the University of Milano-Bicocca. His principal research interests are in classical field theory, dynamical systems (classical and quantum vortex dynamics and magnetohydrodynamics in particular) and structural complexity. He is known for his contributions to the field of geometric and topological fluid dynamics and, in particular, for his work on kinetic and magnetic helicity, physical knot theory and the emergent area of "knotted fields".

== Education ==
Ricca was born in Casale Monferrato, where he attended the Liceo Scientifico Palli before going to Turin, where he read engineering and mathematics at the Politecnico di Torino. By a prestigious scholarship offered by the Association for the Promotion of the Scientific and Technological Development of Piedmont (ASSTP, Turin), he entered Trinity College of Cambridge University, where he read mathematics. His Ph.D. work was conducted under the guidance of H. Keith Moffatt on the subject of topological fluid dynamics. In 1991, while completing his doctoral studies, he was awarded the J.T. Knight's Prize in Mathematics for work on the geometric interpretation of soliton conserved quantities, obtaining the Ph.D. in Applied Mathematics for work on geometric and topological aspects of vortex filament dynamics.

== Career ==
After visiting the Institute for Theoretical Physics (UC Santa Barbara) and the Institute for Advanced Study (Princeton), Ricca returned to England to work at the Mathematics Department of University College London as a Research Fellow and part-time lecturer. From 1993 to 1995, he also held a joint position at the Politecnico di Torino as a junior researcher. In 2004, he moved to the Department of Mathematics and Applications of the University of Milano-Bicocca, to become Associate Professor of Mathematical Physics. He held many visiting positions in various institutions worldwide. Since 2016, he has been a Distinguished Visiting Guest Professor at the Beijing University of Technology (BJUT); in 2023, he became an Affiliate of the World Premier Institute for Sustainability with Knotted Chiral Meta Matter () of Hiroshima University, and in 2025, an Associate of the Higgs Centre for Theoretical Physics() of Edinburgh University.

== Research ==
Ricca's main research interests lie in ideal fluid dynamics, particularly as regards geometric and topological aspects of vortex flows and magnetic fields forming knots, links and braids. Aspects of potential theory of knotted fields, structural complexity and energy of filament tangles are also at the core of his research.

=== Geometric aspects of dynamical systems ===
In the context of classical vortex dynamics, Ricca's main contributions concern the geometric interpretation of certain conserved quantities associated with soliton solutions of integrable systems and the first study of three-dimensional effects of torsion on vortex filament dynamics. In ideal magnetohydrodynamics, Ricca has demonstrated the effects of inflexional instability of twisted magnetic flux tubes that trigger braid formation in solar coronal loops. In more recent years Ricca has been concerned with the role of minimal Seifert surfaces spanning knots and links, providing analytical description of the topological transition of a soap film surface by the emergence of a twisted fold (cusp) singularity. His current work aims to establish connections between isophase minimal surfaces spanning defects in Bose-Einstein condensates and critical energy.

=== Topological fluid dynamics ===
In 1992, relying on earlier work by Berger and Field, Moffatt and Ricca established a deep connection between topology and classical field theory extending the original result by Keith Moffatt on the topological interpretation of hydrodynamical helicity and providing a rigorous derivation of the linking number of an isolated flux tube from the helicity of classical fluid mechanics in terms of writhe and twist. He also derived explicit torus knot solutions to integrable equations of hydrodynamic type, and he contributed to determining new relations between the energy of knotted fields and topological information in terms of crossing and winding number information. In collaboration with Xin Liu, Ricca derived the Jones and HOMFLYPT knot polynomial invariants from the helicity of fluid flows, Hence, extending the initial work on helicity to highly complex networks of filament structures. This work opened up the possibility to quantify natural decay processes in terms of structural topological complexity. As regards quantum fluid systems, Ricca and collaborators demonstrated the physical implications of a superposed twist phase as a Aharonov–Bohm effect for the formation of new defects in condensates, and provided analytical and topological proofs of the zero helicity condition for Seifert-framed defects.

=== Dynamical models in high-dimensional manifolds ===
In the context of high-dimensional manifolds in 1991 Ricca derived the intrinsic equations of motion of a string as a model for the then emerging string theory of high-energy particle physics, proposing a connection between the hierarchy of integrable equations of hydrodynamic type and the general setting of intrinsic kinematics of one-dimensional objects in (2n+1)-dimensional manifolds. Recently, he contributed to extending the hydrodynamic description of the Gross-Pitaevskii equation to general Riemannian manifolds, with possible applications to analog models of gravity in cosmological black hole theory

=== Origin and development of mathematical concepts ===
With a comprehensive review work Ricca contributed to uncover original results by Tullio Levi-Civita and his student Luigi Sante Da Rios on asymptotic potential theory of slender tubes with applications to vortex dynamics, thus anticipating by more than 50 years fundamental discoveries later done in soliton theory and fluid mechanics. He also offered proof of Carl Friedrich Gauss' own possible derivation of the origin of the linking number concept, and the independent derivation done by James Clerk Maxwell.

== Research-Related Activities ==
In the year 2000, he co-organised and directed a 4-month research programme on geometry and topology of fluid flows held at the Newton Institute for Mathematical Sciences (Cambridge, UK), followed in 2001 by a CIME Summer School under the auspices of the Italian Mathematical Union (UMI). In 2011, he organised a 3-month programme on knots and applications held at the Ennio De Giorgi Mathematical Research Centre of the Scuola Normale Superiore in Pisa. In 2016, he organised an IUTAM Symposium on helicity (hosted by the Istituto Veneto di Scienze, Lettere ed Arti in Venice) that gathered more than 100 scientists from 20 different countries, and in September 2019 he organised and directed at the Beijing University of Technology (BJUT) the first programme in China devoted to topological aspects of knotted fields. He is a founding member of GEOTOP-A, an international web-seminar series that was launched in 2018 to promote applications of geometry and topology in science. He is also a founding member of The Association for Mathematical Research (AMR), a non-profit organisation launched in 2021 to support mathematical research and scholarship through a broad spectrum of services to the mathematical community.

== Awards and Distinctions ==
- 1991 J. T. Knight's Prize, U. Cambridge (UK).

== Edited volumes ==
- Ricca, R.L. (Editor) An Introduction to the Geometry and Topology of Fluid Flows. NATO ASI Series II 47. Kluwer, Dordrecht, The Netherlands (2001). ISBN 978-1402002069
- Ricca, R.L. (Editor) Lectures on Topological Fluid Mechanics. Springer-CIME Lecture Notes in Mathematics 1973. Springer-Verlag, Heidelberg, Germany (2009). ISBN 9783642008368
- Adams, C.C., Gordon, C.McA., Jones, V.F.R., Kauffman, L.H., Lambropoulou, S., Millett, K.C., Przytycki, J.H., Ricca, R.L., Sazdanovic, R. (Editors) Knots, Low-Dimensional Topology and Applications. Springer-Nature, Switzerland (2019). ISBN 978-3-030-16030-2
- Ricca, R.L. & Liu, X. (Editors) Knotted Fields. Lecture Notes in Mathematics 2344. Springer-Nature, Switzerland (2024). ISBN 978-3-031-57984-4
