= Gheorghe Călugăreanu =

Romanian mathematician

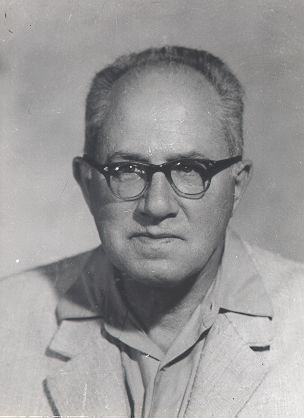
- Born: June 16, 1902; Iași, Kingdom of Romania
- Died: November 15, 1976 (aged 74); Cluj-Napoca, Socialist Republic of Romania
- Resting place: Bellu Cemetery, Bucharest
- Education: University of Cluj; University of Paris
- Known for: Writhe of a knot Călugăreanu invariant
- Father: Dimitrie Călugăreanu
- Scientific career
- Fields: Mathematics
- Workplaces: Babeș-Bolyai University
- Thesis: Sur les fonctions polygènes d'une variable complexe (1928)
- Doctoral advisor: Émile Picard
- Doctoral students: Petru Mocanu

Gheorghe Călugăreanu (16 June 1902 – 15 November 1976) was a Romanian mathematician, professor at Babeș-Bolyai University, and full member of the Romanian Academy.

He was born in Iași, the son of physician, naturalist, and physiologist Dimitrie Călugăreanu. From 1913 to 1921 he studied at the Gheorghe Lazăr High School in Bucharest, after which he attended University of Cluj, graduating in 1924. In 1926 he went to Paris to pursue his studies at the Sorbonne, supported by a scholarship from the Romanian government. He obtained his Ph.D. in mathematics in 1929, with thesis Sur les fonctions polygènes d'une variable complexe written under the direction of Émile Picard and defended before a jury that also included Édouard Goursat and Gaston Julia. After returning to Romania, he was appointed assistant the University of Cluj in 1930; he was promoted to lecturer in 1934 and named professor in 1942. From 1953 to 1957 he served as Dean of the Faculty of Mathematics. His Ph.D. students include Petru Mocanu. He was elected a corresponding member of the Romanian Academy in 1955, and he became a full member in 1963.

Călugăreanu studied the theory of functions of a complex variable (meromorphic functions, univalent functions, analytic extension invariants), as well as differential geometry and algebraic topology, especially in knot theory. In his best-known work, he established in 1961 the following foundational result regarding the writhe of a knot: take a ribbon in three-dimensional space, let $\operatorname{Lk}$ be the linking number of its border components, and let $\operatorname{Tw}$ be its total twist; then the difference $\operatorname{Wr}=\operatorname{Lk}-\operatorname{Tw}$ depends only on the core curve of the ribbon. In a paper from 1959, he showed how to calculate the writhe of a knot by means of a Gaussian double integral. Călugăreanu's formula has since been pursued by James H. White and F. Brock Fuller, leading to applications in DNA topology, where writhe is used to describe the amount a piece of DNA is deformed as a result of torsional stress (a phenomenon known as DNA supercoiling). The topological interpretation of helicity in terms of the Gauss linking number and its limiting form has been called the "Călugăreanu invariant" by Keith Moffatt and Renzo L. Ricca.

He died of cancer in Cluj-Napoca in 1976; following his wishes, he was cremated and the urn was deposited at Bellu Cemetery in Bucharest.

== Publications ==
- Calugareano, G. (1929). "Les fonctions polygènes comme intégrales d'équations différentielles". Transactions of the American Mathematical Society. 31 (2): 372–378. doi:10.2307/1989390. JSTOR 1989390. MR 1501488.
- "L'intégrale de Gauss et l'analyse des nœuds tridimensionnels" (PDF). Revue de Mathématiques Pure et Appliquées (in French). 4: 5–20. 1959. MR 0131846.
- "Sur les enlacements tridimensionnels des courbes fermées" (PDF). Comunicările Academiei Republicii Populare Romîne (in French). 11: 829–832. 1961. MR 0132511.
- "Sur les classes d'isotopie des nœuds tridimensionnels et leurs invariants". Czechoslovak Mathematical Journal (in French). 11 (4): 588–625. 1961. doi:10.21136/CMJ.1961.100486. MR 0149378.
- Elemente de teoria funcțiilor de o variabilă complexă (in Romanian). Bucharest: Editura Didactică și Pedagogică. 1963. MR 0193210. OCLC 895723233.
- Calugareanu, G. (1975). "Sur un théorème de H. Zieschang". L'Enseignement mathématique. 2 (in French). 21 (1): 15–30. doi:10.5169/seals-47327. MR 0377887.
