= Superhelix =

Helix made of helices

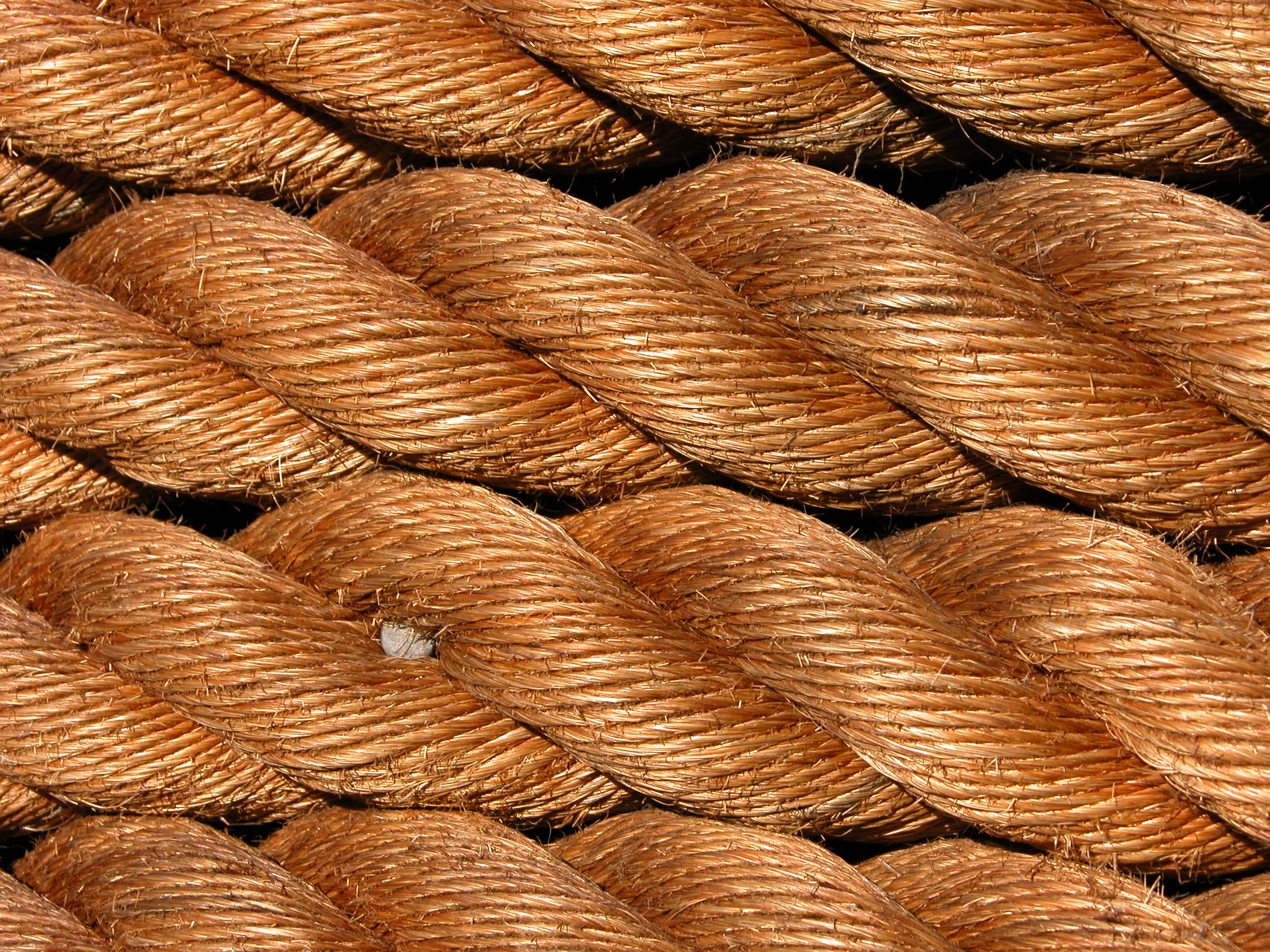
Ropes have superhelical structures

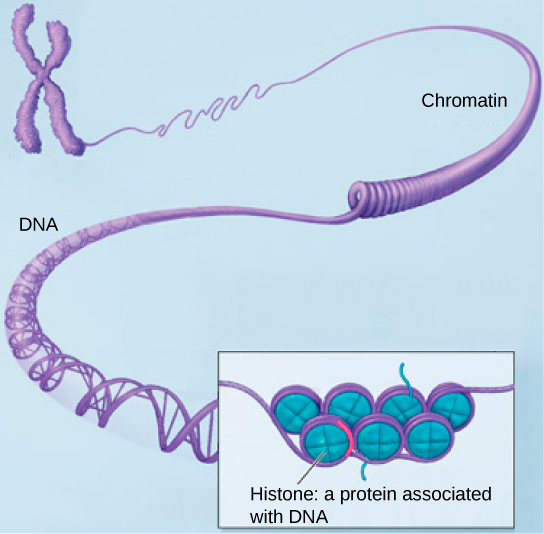
An illustration showing the superhelical structure of chromatin

A superhelix is a molecular structure in which a helix is itself coiled into a helix. This is significant to both proteins and genetic material, such as overwound circular DNA.

The earliest significant reference in molecular biology is from 1971, by F. B. Fuller:

A geometric invariant of a space curve, the writhing number, is defined and studied. For the central curve of a twisted cord the writhing number measures the extent to which coiling of the central curve has relieved local twisting of the cord. This study originated in response to questions that arise in the study of supercoiled double-stranded DNA rings.

About the writhing number, mathematician W. F. Pohl says:

It is well known that the writhing number is a standard measure of the global geometry of a closed space curve.

Contrary to intuition, a topological property, the linking number, arises from the geometric properties twist and writhe according to the following relationship:

L_{k}= T + W,

where L_{k} is the linking number, W is the writhe and T is the twist of the coil.

The linking number refers to the number of times that one strand wraps around the other. In DNA this property does not change and can only be modified by specialized enzymes called topoisomerases.

== See also ==
- DNA supercoil (superhelical DNA)
- Coiled coil
- Knot theory
