= Supercell composite parameter =

American thunderstorm prediction index

The supercell composite index on April 27, 2011, overlaid with tracks of EF5-rated tornadoes (in black)

The Supercell Composite Parameter, often abbreviated as SCP, is a multi-parameter index used by the Storm Prediction Center that outlines areas of the United States where the development of supercell thunderstorms is favorable. The parameter uses convective available potential energy, storm relative helicity and vertical wind shear to determine specific areas. A value of 1 indicates a normal atmosphere while values above two are conducive for supercells.

== Equation ==
Two equations can be used to conclude the supercell composite for an area:

SCP = (MUCAPE/(1000 J/Kg^-1)) x ((0-3 km SRH)/(150 m^2s-^2)) x ((BRN denominator)/(40 m^2s-^2))

SCP = (MUCAPE/(1000 J/Kg^-1)) x ((Effective shear)/(20 m^2s-^2)) x ((Effective SRH)/(50 m^2s-^2))

== See also ==
- Significant tornado parameter
