= Ribbon (mathematics) =

Geometrical smooth strip

In differential geometry, a ribbon (or strip) is the combination of a smooth space curve and its corresponding normal vector. More formally, a ribbon denoted by $(X,U)$ includes a curve $X$ given by a three-dimensional vector $X(s)$, depending continuously on the curve arc-length $s$ ($a\leq s \leq b$), and a unit vector $U(s)$ perpendicular to ${\partial X \over \partial s}(s)$ at each point. Ribbons have seen particular application as regards DNA.

== Properties and implications ==
The ribbon $(X,U)$ is called simple if $X$ is a simple curve (i.e. without self-intersections) and closed and if $U$ and all its derivatives agree at $a$ and $b$. For any simple closed ribbon the curves $X+\varepsilon U$ given parametrically by $X(s)+\varepsilon U(s)$ are, for all sufficiently small positive $\varepsilon$, simple closed curves disjoint from $X$.

The ribbon concept plays an important role in the Călugăreanu formula, that states that

$$Lk = Wr + Tw ,$$

where $Lk$ is the asymptotic (Gauss) linking number, the integer number of turns of the ribbon around its axis; $Wr$ denotes the total writhing number (or simply writhe), a measure of non-planarity of the ribbon's axis curve; and $Tw$ is the total twist number (or simply twist), the rate of rotation of the ribbon around its axis.

Ribbon theory investigates geometric and topological aspects of a mathematical reference ribbon associated with physical and biological properties, such as those arising in topological fluid dynamics, DNA modeling and in material science.

== See also ==
- Bollobás–Riordan polynomial
- Knots and graphs
- Knot theory
- DNA supercoil
- Möbius strip

== Bibliography ==
- Adams, Colin (2004), The Knot Book: An Elementary Introduction to the Mathematical Theory of Knots, American Mathematical Society, ISBN 0-8218-3678-1, MR 2079925
- Călugăreanu, Gheorghe (1959), "L'intégrale de Gauss et l'analyse des nœuds tridimensionnels", Revue de Mathématiques Pure et Appliquées, 4: 5–20, MR 0131846
- Călugăreanu, Gheorghe (1961), "Sur les classes d'isotopie des noeuds tridimensionels et leurs invariants", Czechoslovak Mathematical Journal, 11: 588–625, doi:10.21136/CMJ.1961.100486, hdl:10338.dmlcz/100486, MR 0149378
- White, James H. (1969), "Self-linking and the Gauss integral in higher dimensions", American Journal of Mathematics, 91 (3): 693–728, doi:10.2307/2373348, JSTOR 2373348, MR 0253264
