= PKS 0405−385 =

Quasar in the constellation Eridanus

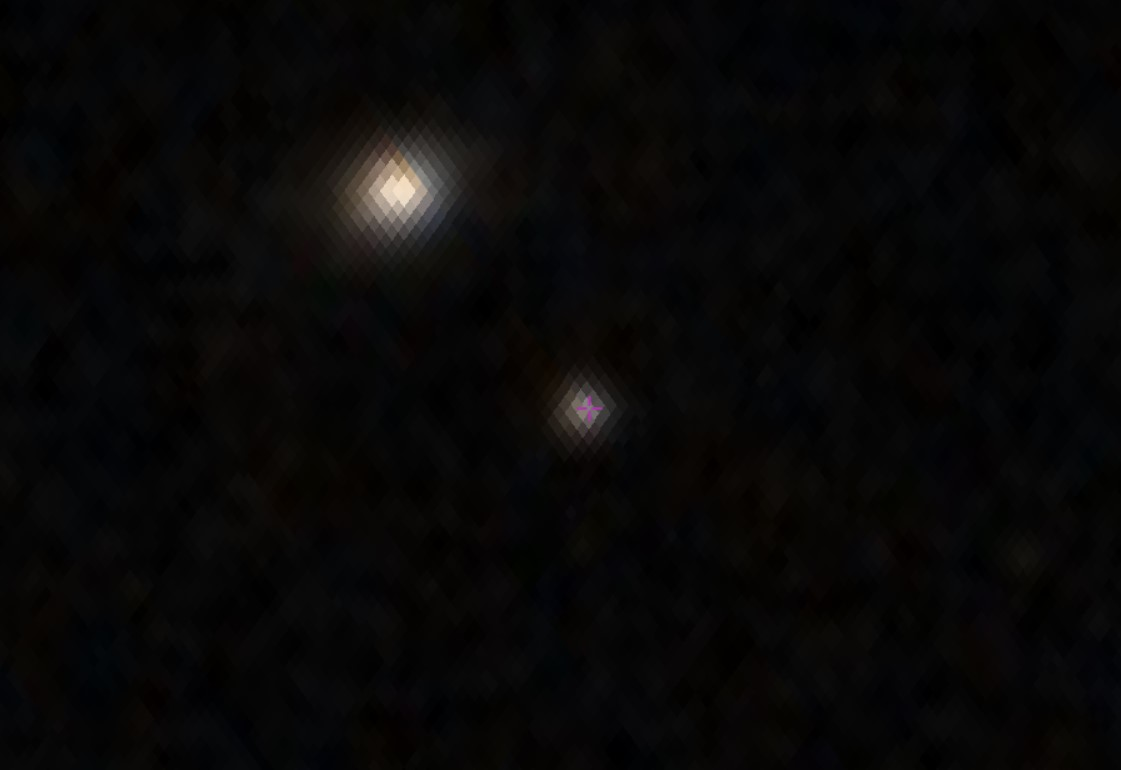
- The blazar PKS 0405−385

Observation data (Epoch J2000.0)
- Constellation: Eridanus
- Right ascension: 04^{h} 06^{m} 59.035^{s}
- Declination: −38° 26′ 28.04″
- Redshift: 1.285
- Type: FSRQ

Other designations
- 4FGL J0407.0−3826

PKS 0405−385 is a blazar in the constellation of Eridanus. This is a compact radio quasar with a redshift (z) of 1.285, an indicator of its significant distance. The radio spectrum of this source appears flat, making it a flat-spectrum radio quasar (FSRQ).

== Description ==
The visible light spectrum of PKS 0405−385 displays strong, broad emission lines, with an intermediate absorption occurring at a redshift of 0.875. Examination using VLBI shows the radio source spans less than five microarcseconds (μas) in angle. In 1993, this quasar was found to undergo variation in radio flux density during time spans of less than an hour. This variability is intermittent during episodes lasting for weeks or months. The radio flux was also found to vary on longer timescales for periods of a month or two.

If the short-term variation were due to the quasar, it would imply an extreme brightness temperature of about 10^{21} K. Instead, it was proposed that the variation was the result of interstellar scintillation due to ionized clouds in the Milky Way. The radio emission from the quasar underwent rotation of linear polarization during these events, lending support to the idea of scintillation. A scattering medium at a distance of 3–30 pc would explain these observations, bringing the modelled peak brightness temperature down to a more plausible 2.0×10^{13} K. The episodic nature of the rapid variations may be explained by changes in the quasar or the interstellar medium. PKS 0405−385 is one of only three known extreme scintillators, the others being PKS 1257−326 and J1819+385.

In 2022, the gamma ray emission from PKS 0405−385 was found to undergo quasi-periodic oscillation with a period of about 2.8 years. This may be explained by helical motion in a jet originating from the supermassive black hole (SMBH), or the core SMBH is itself a binary system. Enhanced gamma ray activity was observed from this source in 2019 and 2023.
