= Hydrodynamical helicity =

Aspect of Eulerian fluid dynamics

In fluid dynamics, helicity is, under appropriate conditions, an invariant of the Euler equations of fluid flow, having a topological interpretation as a measure of linkage and/or knottedness of vortex lines in the flow. This was first proved by Jean-Jacques Moreau in 1961 and Moffatt derived it in 1969 without the knowledge of Moreau's paper. This helicity invariant is an extension of Woltjer's theorem for magnetic helicity.

Let $\mathbf{u}(\mathbf{x},t)$ be the velocity field and $\boldsymbol{\omega}\equiv \nabla\times\mathbf{u}$ the corresponding vorticity field. Under the following three conditions, the vortex lines are transported with (or 'frozen-in') the flow: (i) the fluid is inviscid; (ii) either the flow is incompressible ($\nabla\cdot\mathbf{u} = 0$), or it is compressible with a barotropic relation $p = p(\rho)$ between pressure p and density ρ; and (iii) any body forces acting on the fluid are conservative. Under these conditions, any closed surface S whose normal vectors are orthogonal to the vorticity (that is, $\mathbf{n} \cdot\boldsymbol{\omega}= 0$) is, like vorticity, transported with the flow.

Let V be the volume inside such a surface. Then the helicity in V, denoted H, is defined by the volume integral

$$H = \int_V \mathbf{u} \cdot \boldsymbol{\omega}\, dV.$$

For a localised vorticity distribution in an unbounded fluid, V can be taken to be the whole space, and H is then the total helicity of the flow. H is invariant precisely because the vortex lines are frozen in the flow and their linkage and/or knottedness is therefore conserved, as recognized by Lord Kelvin (1868). Helicity is a pseudo-scalar quantity: it changes sign under change from a right-handed to a left-handed frame of reference; it can be considered as a measure of the handedness (or chirality) of the flow. Helicity is one of the four known integral invariants of the Euler equations; the other three are energy, momentum and angular momentum.

For two linked unknotted vortex tubes having circulations $\kappa_1$ and $\kappa_2$, and no internal twist, the helicity is given by $H = \plusmn 2n \kappa_1 \kappa_2$, where n is the Gauss linking number of the two tubes, and the plus or minus is chosen according as the linkage is right- or left-handed. For a single knotted vortex tube with circulation $\kappa$, then, as shown by Moffatt & Ricca (1992), the helicity is given by $H = \kappa^2 (Wr + Tw)$, where $Wr$ and $Tw$ are the writhe and twist of the tube; the sum $Wr + Tw$ is known to be invariant under continuous deformation of the tube.

The invariance of helicity provides an essential cornerstone of the subject topological fluid dynamics and magnetohydrodynamics, which is concerned with global properties of flows and their topological characteristics.

== Meteorology ==
In meteorology, helicity corresponds to the transfer of vorticity from the environment to an air parcel in convective motion. Here, the definition of helicity is simplified to only use the horizontal component of wind and vorticity, and to only integrate in the vertical direction, replacing the volume integral with a one-dimensional definite integral or line integral:

$$H = \int_{Z_1}^{Z_2} \mathbf V_h \cdot \boldsymbol \zeta_h \, dZ = \int_{Z_1}^{Z_2} \mathbf V_h \cdot \left(\nabla \times \mathbf V_h\right) dZ ,$$

where

- $Z$ is the altitude,
- $\mathbf V_h$ is the horizontal velocity,
- $\boldsymbol \zeta_h$ is the horizontal vorticity.

According to this formula, if the horizontal wind does not change direction with altitude, H will be zero as $V_h$ and $\nabla \times V_h$ are perpendicular, making their scalar product nil. H is then positive if the wind veers (turns clockwise) with altitude and negative if it backs (turns counterclockwise). This helicity used in meteorology has energy units per units of mass [m^{2}/s^{2}] and thus is interpreted as a measure of energy transfer by the wind shear with altitude, including directional.

This notion is used to predict the possibility of tornadic development in a thundercloud. In this case, the vertical integration will be limited below cloud tops (generally 3 km or 10,000 feet) and the horizontal wind will be calculated to wind relative to the storm in subtracting its motion:

$$\mathrm{SRH} = \int_{Z_1}^{Z_2} \left( \mathbf V_h - \mathbf C \right)  \cdot \left( \nabla \times \mathbf V_h \right) \, dZ$$
where $\mathbf C$ is the cloud motion relative to the ground.

Critical values of SRH (Storm Relative Helicity) for tornadic development, as researched in North America, are:

- SRH = 150-299 ... supercells possible with weak tornadoes according to Fujita scale
- SRH = 300-499 ... very favourable for supercell development and strong tornadoes
- SRH > 450 ... violent tornadoes
- When calculated only below 1 km (4,000 feet), the cut-off value is 100.

Helicity in itself is not the only component of severe thunderstorms, and these values are to be taken with caution. That is why the Energy Helicity Index (EHI) has been created. It is the result of SRH multiplied by the CAPE (Convective Available Potential Energy) and then divided by a threshold CAPE:

$$\mathrm{EHI} = \frac{\mathrm{CAPE} \times \mathrm{SRH}}{\text{160,000}}$$

This incorporates not only the helicity but also the energy of the air parcel and thus tries to eliminate weak potential for thunderstorms even in strong SRH regions. The critical values of EHI:

- EHI = 1 ... possible tornadoes
- EHI = 1-2 ... moderate to strong tornadoes
- EHI > 2 ... strong tornadoes

== General references ==
- Batchelor, G.K., (1967, reprinted 2000) An Introduction to Fluid Dynamics, Cambridge Univ. Press
- Ohkitani, K., "Elementary Account Of Vorticity And Related Equations". Cambridge University Press. January 30, 2005. ISBN 0-521-81984-9
- Chorin, A.J., "Vorticity and Turbulence". Applied Mathematical Sciences, Vol 103, Springer-Verlag. March 1, 1994. ISBN 0-387-94197-5
- Majda, A.J. & Bertozzi, A.L., "Vorticity and Incompressible Flow". Cambridge University Press; 1st edition. December 15, 2001. ISBN 0-521-63948-4
- Tritton, D.J., "Physical Fluid Dynamics". Van Nostrand Reinhold, New York. 1977. ISBN 0-19-854493-6
- Arfken, G., "Mathematical Methods for Physicists", 3rd ed. Academic Press, Orlando, FL. 1985. ISBN 0-12-059820-5
- Moffatt, H.K. (1969) The degree of knottedness of tangled vortex lines. J. Fluid Mech. 35, pp. 117–129.
- Moffatt, H.K. & Ricca, R.L. (1992) Helicity and the Cǎlugǎreanu Invariant. Proc. R. Soc. Lond. A 439, pp. 411–429.
- Thomson, W. (Lord Kelvin) (1868) On vortex motion. Trans. Roy. Soc. Edin. 25, pp. 217–260.
