= Force-free magnetic field =

Approximation in plasma physics

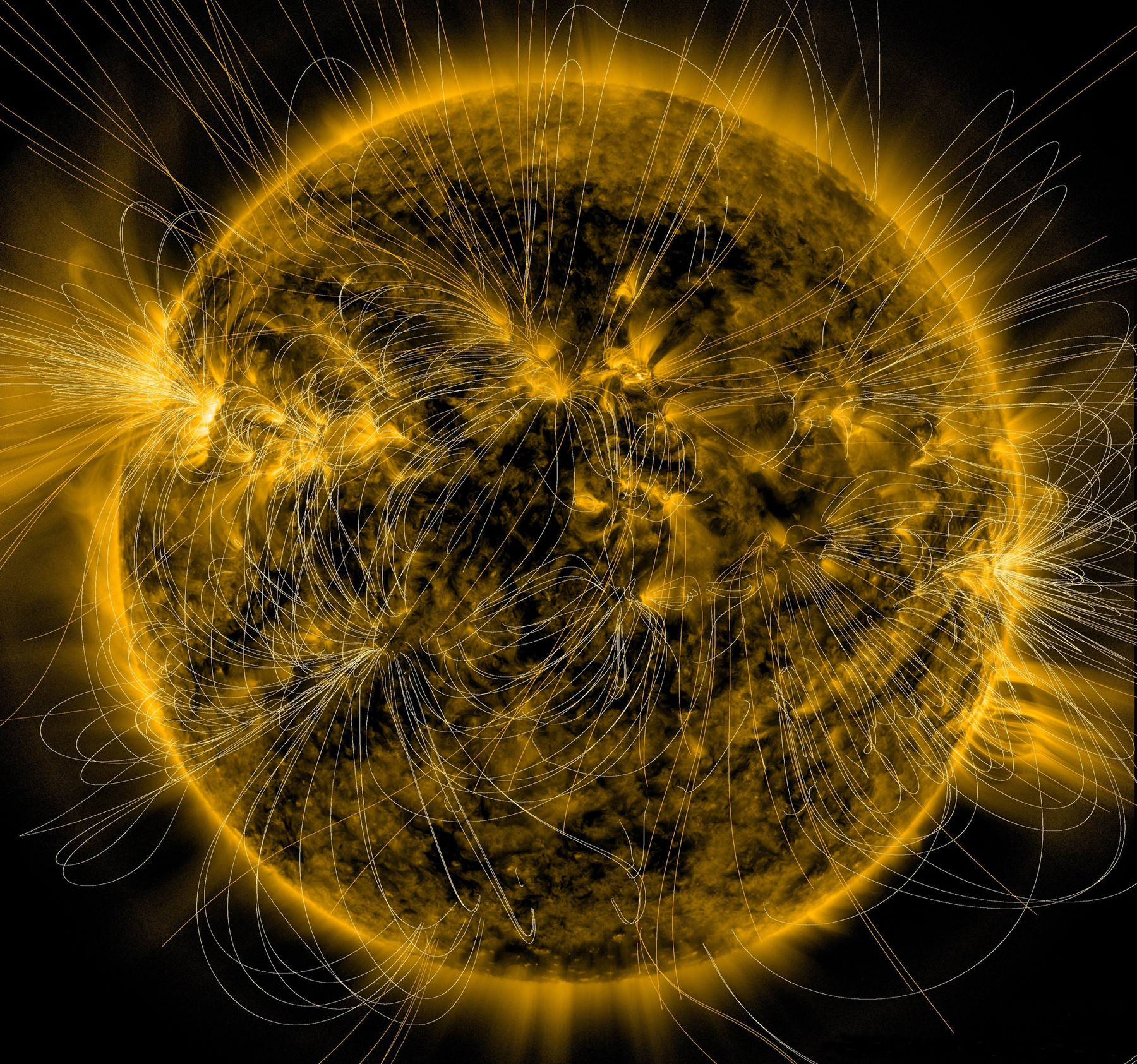
The magnetic field in the Sun's corona is often approximated as a force-free field.

In plasma physics, a force-free magnetic field is a magnetic field in which the Lorentz force is equal to zero and the magnetic pressure greatly exceeds the plasma pressure such that non-magnetic forces can be neglected. For a force-free field, the electric current density is either zero or parallel to the magnetic field.

== Definition ==
When a magnetic field is approximated as force-free, all non-magnetic forces are neglected and the Lorentz force vanishes. For non-magnetic forces to be neglected, it is assumed that the ratio of the plasma pressure to the magnetic pressure—the plasma β—is much less than one, i.e., $\beta \ll 1$. With this assumption, magnetic pressure dominates over plasma pressure such that the latter can be ignored. It is also assumed that the magnetic pressure dominates over other non-magnetic forces, such as gravity, so that these forces can similarly be ignored.

In SI units, the Lorentz force condition for a static magnetic field $\mathbf{B}$ can be expressed as
$$\begin{align}
\mathbf{j} \times \mathbf{B} &= \mathbf{0}, \\
\nabla \cdot \mathbf{B} &= 0,
\end{align}$$
where
$$\mathbf{j} = \frac{1}{\mu_0}\nabla \times \mathbf{B}$$
is the current density and $\mu_0$ is the vacuum permeability. Alternatively, this can be written as
$$\begin{align}
\left(\nabla \times \mathbf{B}\right) \times \mathbf{B} &= \mathbf{0}, \\
\nabla \cdot \mathbf{B} &= 0.
\end{align}$$
These conditions are fulfilled when the current vanishes or is parallel to the magnetic field.

=== Zero current density ===
If the current density is identically zero, then the magnetic field is the gradient of a magnetic scalar potential $\phi$:
$$\mathbf{B} = -\nabla\phi.$$
The substitution of this into $\nabla \cdot \mathbf{B} = 0$ results in Laplace's equation, $\nabla^2\phi = 0,$ which can often be readily solved, depending on the precise boundary conditions. In this case, the field is referred to as a potential field or vacuum magnetic field.

=== Nonzero current density ===
If the current density is not zero, then it must be parallel to the magnetic field, i.e., $\mu_0 \mathbf{j} = \alpha \mathbf{B}$ where $\alpha$ is a scalar function known as the force-free parameter or force-free function. This implies that
$$\begin{align}
\nabla \times \mathbf{B} &= \alpha\mathbf{B}, \\
\mathbf{B} \cdot \nabla\alpha &= 0.
\end{align}$$
The force-free parameter can be a function of position but must be constant along field lines.

==== Linear force-free field ====
When the force-free parameter $\alpha$ is constant everywhere, the field is called a linear force-free field (LFFF). A constant $\alpha$ allows for the derivation of a vector Helmholtz equation
$$\nabla^2\mathbf{B} = -\alpha^2 \mathbf{B}$$
by taking the curl of the nonzero current density equations above.

==== Nonlinear force-free field ====
When the force-free parameter $\alpha$ depends on position, the field is called a nonlinear force-free field (NLFFF). In this case, the equations do not possess a general solution, and usually must be solved numerically.

== Physical examples ==
In the Sun's upper chromosphere and lower corona, the plasma β can locally be of order 0.01 or lower allowing for the magnetic field to be approximated as force-free.

== See also ==
- Woltjer's theorem
- Chandrasekhar–Kendall function
- Magnetic helicity
