= Twist (differential geometry) =

Differential geometry term

In differential geometry, the twist of a ribbon is its rate of axial rotation. Let a ribbon $(X,U)$ be composed of a space curve, $X=X(s)$, where $s$ is the arc length of $X$, and $U=U(s)$ a unit normal vector, perpendicular at each point to ${\partial X(s) \over \partial s}(s)$. Since the ribbon $(X,U)$ has edges $X$ and $X'=X+\varepsilon U$, the twist (or total twist number) $Tw$ measures the average winding of the edge curve $X'$ around and along the axial curve $X$. According to Love (1944) twist is defined by

$$Tw = \dfrac{1}{2\pi} \int \left( U \times \dfrac{dU}{ds} \right) \cdot \dfrac{dX}{ds} ds \; ,$$

where $dX/ds$ is the unit tangent vector to $X$. The total twist number $Tw$ can be decomposed (Moffatt & Ricca 1992) into normalized total torsion $T \in [0,1)$ and intrinsic twist $N \in \mathbb{Z}$ as

$$Tw = \dfrac{1}{2\pi} \int \tau \; ds + \dfrac{\left[ \Theta \right]_X}{2\pi} = T+N \; ,$$

where $\tau=\tau(s)$ is the torsion of the space curve $X$, and $\left[ \Theta \right]_X$ denotes the total rotation angle of $U$ along $X$. Neither $N$ nor $Tw$ are independent of the ribbon field $U$. Instead, only the normalized torsion $T$ is an invariant of the curve $X$ (Banchoff & White 1975).

When the ribbon is deformed so as to pass through an inflectional state (i.e. $X$ has a point of inflection), the torsion $\tau$ becomes singular. The total torsion $T$ jumps by $\pm 1$ and the total angle $N$ simultaneously makes an equal and opposite jump of $\mp 1$ (Moffatt & Ricca 1992) and $Tw$ remains continuous. This behavior has many important consequences for energy considerations in many fields of science (Ricca 1997, 2005; Goriely 2006).

Together with the writhe $Wr$ of $X$, twist is a geometric quantity that plays an important role in the application of the Călugăreanu–White–Fuller formula $Lk = Wr + Tw$ in topological fluid dynamics (for its close relation to kinetic and magnetic helicity of a vector field), physical knot theory, and structural complexity analysis.
