= Deoxyribonuclease X =

Identifiers
- EC no.: 3.1.22.5
- CAS no.: 97002-82-9

Databases
- IntEnz: IntEnz view
- BRENDA: BRENDA entry
- ExPASy: NiceZyme view
- KEGG: KEGG entry
- MetaCyc: metabolic pathway
- PRIAM: profile
- PDB structures: RCSB PDB PDBe PDBsum
Search
- PMC: articles
- PubMed: articles
- NCBI: proteins

Deoxyribonuclease X (EC 3.1.22.5, Escherichia coli endodeoxyribonuclease, Escherichia coli endodeoxyribonuclease X) is an enzyme. This enzyme catalyses the following chemical reaction

Endonucleolytic cleavage of supercoiled plasma DNA to linear DNA duplexes

This enzyme has preference for supercoiled DNA.
