= PKS 0727−11 =

Blazar in the constellation of Puppis

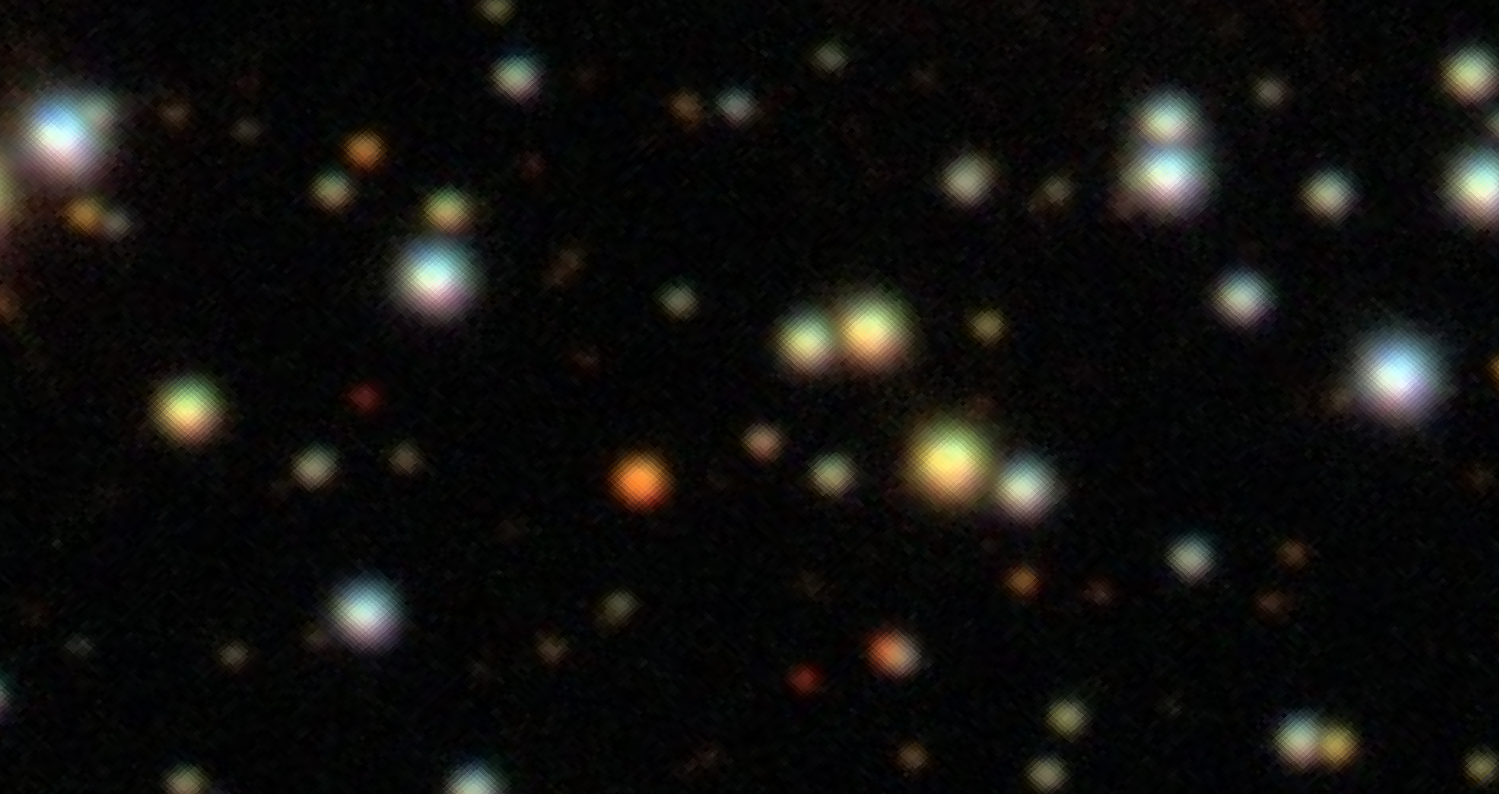
- SDSS image of blazar PKS 0727−11

Observation data (J2000.0 epoch)
- Constellation: Puppis
- Right ascension: 07^{h} 30^{m} 19.11^{s}
- Declination: −11° 41′ 12.60″
- Redshift: 1.591000
- Heliocentric radial velocity: 476,970 km\s
- Distance: 9.556 Gly
- Apparent magnitude (V): 20.30

Characteristics
- Type: FSRQ

Other designations
- NVSS J073019−114112, TXS 0727−115, PKS J0730−1141, 3FGL J0730.2−1141

PKS 0727−11 is a blazar located in southern constellation of Puppis. The redshift of the object has been determined as (z) 1.591, with it first being discovered during the Parkes survey conducted at the Parkes Observatory in 1966. The radio spectrum of the object is flat, classifying it a flat-spectrum radio quasar.

== Description ==
PKS 0727−11 has been found variable on the electromagnetic spectrum. It is noted for its variable flux density near 5 GHz and at the 10.6 GHz mark when it was observed between 1968 and 1969, with evidence of rapid variations at 2.3 GHz in 1971. It also had an amplitude outburst at 2 Jy, which subsequently peaked in 1975 at frequencies ranging from 10.6 to 2.7 GHz.

A gamma-ray flare was detected from PKS 0727−11 on 21 September 2010 by Fermi Gamma-ray Space Telescope with its daily gamma-ray flux reaching levels of 1.4 ± 0.4 × 10^{−6} photons cm^{2,} an increase of 3.5 in factor. Increased gamma-ray flux reached around 5.0 ± -0.8 × 10^{−7} photons cm^{−2} s^{−1} back in January 2009. The source of the quasar is mainly core-dominated with a jet shown, having either a 90° or a large bend.

The quasar is classified as a polarization rotator. When observed in 1981 by Hugh Aller, it is found to display a systemic time change in polarization which began in middle of 1977. Although on average with a change rate of +106°, it did not occur in linear manner according to Aller. However it is noted to occur in a series of jumps in position angles, with observed large differences of +55° in April 1978, +70° in January 1979, +82° in June 1979 and +68° by September of 1980. Aller also noted the polarization degree of PKS 0727−11 at 4.8 and 8.0 GHz frequencies, appeared fluctuated at a time-scale on the order of half-year. A series of outbursts also occurred in PKS 0727−11 beginning late 1973, with a change of position angle of 90°.

In February 2025, PKS 0727−11 is found to undergo a quasi-periodic oscillation with a period of 168 days. This is likely explained by non-ballistic helical motion in its jet, which in turn is driven by orbital motion of its binary supermassive black hole system. The mass for the primary black hole in PKS 0727−11 is estimated in the range between 3.66 × 10^{8} and 5.79 × 10^{9} M_{☉}.
