= Woltjer's theorem =

Theorem in plasma physics

In plasma physics, Woltjer's theorem states that force-free magnetic fields in a closed system with constant force-free parameter $\alpha$ represent the state with lowest magnetic energy in the system and that the magnetic helicity is invariant under this condition. It is named after Lodewijk Woltjer who derived it in 1958. A force-free magnetic field with flux density $\mathbf{B}$ satisfies

$$\nabla \times \mathbf{B} = \alpha \mathbf{B}$$

where $\alpha$ is a scalar function that is constant along field lines. The helicity $\mathcal{H}$ invariant is given by

$$\frac{d\mathcal{H}}{d t} = 0$$

where $\mathcal{H}$ is related to $\mathbf{B}=\nabla\times \mathbf{A}$ through the vector potential $\mathbf{A}$ as below

$$\mathcal{H} = \int_V \mathbf{A}\cdot\mathbf{B}\ dV = \int_V \mathbf{A} \cdot (\nabla \times \mathbf{A}) \ dV.$$

== See also ==
- Chandrasekhar–Kendall function
- Hydrodynamical helicity
