= Physical knot theory =

Study of mathematical models of knotting phenomena

Physical knot theory is the study of mathematical models of knotting phenomena, often motivated by considerations from biology, chemistry, and physics (Kauffman 1991). Physical knot theory is used to study how geometric and topological characteristics of filamentary structures, such as magnetic flux tubes, vortex filaments, polymers, DNAs, influence their physical properties and functions. It has applications in various fields of science, including topological fluid dynamics, structural complexity analysis and DNA biology (Kauffman 1991, Ricca 1998).

Traditional knot theory models a knot as a simple closed loop in three-dimensional space. Such a knot has no thickness or physical properties such as tension or friction. Physical knot theory incorporates more realistic models. The traditional model is also studied but with an eye toward properties of specific embeddings ("conformations") of the circle. Such properties include ropelength and various knot energies (O’Hara 2003).

Most of the work discussed in this article and in the references below is not concerned with knots tied in physical pieces of rope. For the more specific physics of such knots, see Knot: Physical theory of friction knots.
