= Petru Mocanu =

Romanian mathematician (1931–2016)

Petru T. Mocanu (1 June 1931 – 28 March 2016) was a Romanian mathematician who was elected in 2009 as a titular member of the Romanian Academy.

Mocanu was born in Brăila. He studied at the Nicolae Bălcescu High School in Brăila, graduating in 1950. He then went to study mathematics at Babeș-Bolyai University in Cluj-Napoca, completing his B.Sc in 1953, and his Ph.D. in 1959. His dissertation, written under the supervision of Gheorghe Călugăreanu, was titled Variational methods in the theory of univalent functions. He continued as faculty at Babeș-Bolyai University, rising to the rank of Professor in 1970.

Mocanu was an invited professor at the University of Conakry in 1966–1967, and the Ohio State University in 1992.

== Publications ==
- Miller, Sanford S.; Mocanu, Petru T. (2000), Differential subordinations. Theory and applications, Monographs and Textbooks in Pure and Applied Mathematics, vol. 225, New York: Marcel Dekker, Inc., ISBN 0-8247-0029-5, MR 1760285
- Miller, Sanford S.; Mocanu, Petru T. (1981), "Differential subordinations and univalent functions", Michigan Mathematical Journal, 28 (2): 157–172, doi:10.1307/mmj/1029002507, MR 0616267
- Mocanu, Petru T. (2011), "Injectivity conditions in the complex plane", Complex Analysis and Operator Theory, 5 (3): 759–766, doi:10.1007/s11785-010-0052-y, MR 2836321
