= Dimitrie Călugăreanu =

Romanian physician, naturalist and physiologist (1868 - 1937)

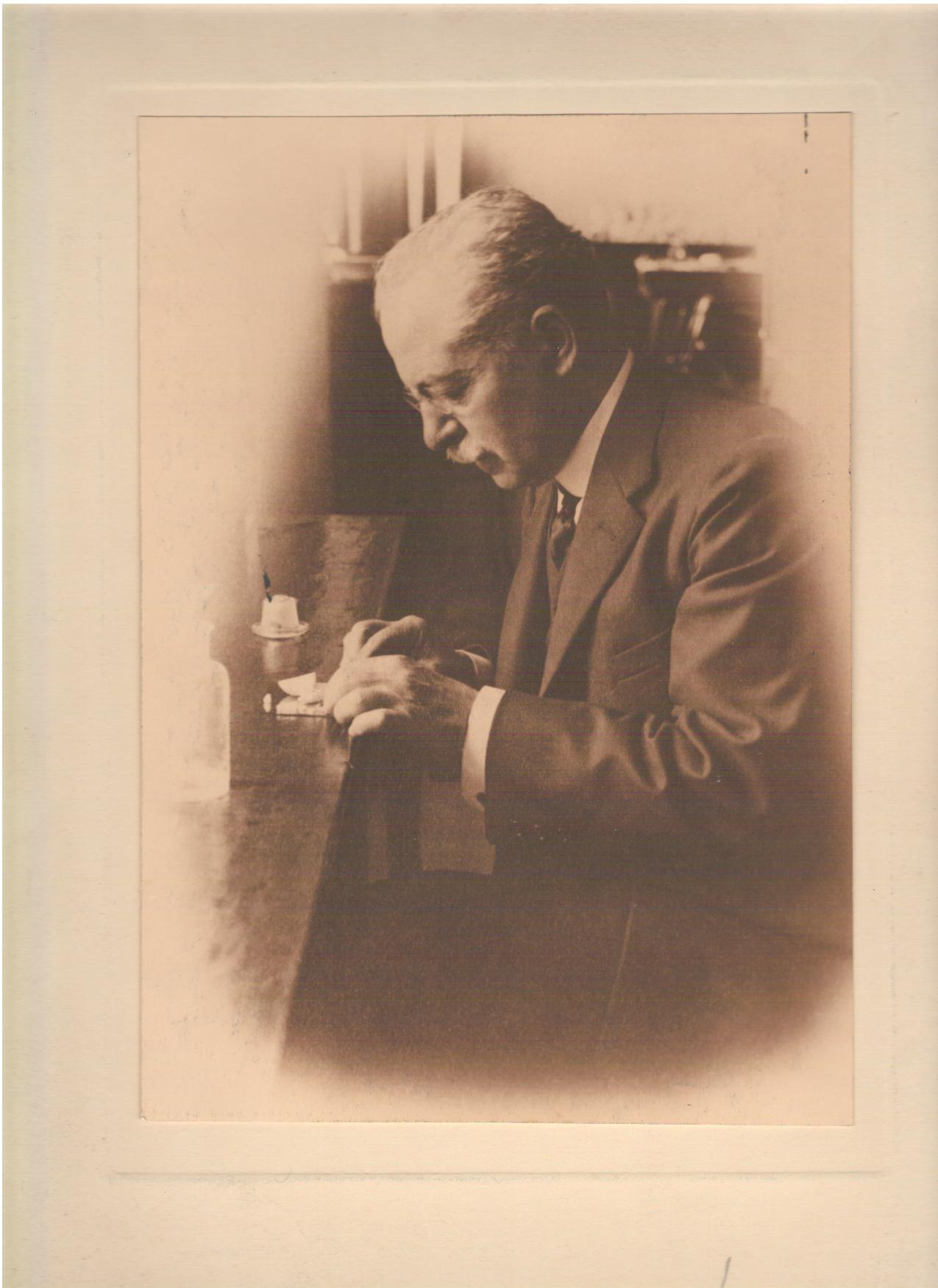
Dimitrie Călugăreanu

Dimitrie Călugăreanu (October 18 [O.S. October 6] 1868)–December 17, 1937) was a Romanian physician, naturalist and physiologist.

Călugăreanu was born in Pomârla, Botoșani County; his parents were the possibly illiterate peasants Constantin and Glicheria. After obtaining a scholarship, he attended the natural sciences department of the University of Iași science faculty, from which he graduated in 1894. He then enrolled in the medical faculty of the University of Berlin. In 1902, he received a doctorate in natural sciences from the University of Paris, his thesis topic being research into hemolysis through experimental physiology and physical chemistry. He was an assistant at the University of Iași morphology laboratory from 1894 to 1897.

Upon returning from France to his native country, Călugăreanu worked as a professor at Bucharest's higher school of veterinary medicine from 1902 to 1905 and an associate professor of physiological chemistry at the science faculty of the University of Bucharest from 1908 to 1919. Following the union of Transylvania with Romania and the creation of the University of Cluj, he was professor of general physiology at the science faculty there from 1919 to 1926. He was faculty dean from 1919 to 1921, and university rector from 1921 to 1922. While in this post, he expressed displeasure at the fact that Hungary's authorities had recently opened universities at Szeged and Debrecen near the Romanian border. He charged that the schools "do not aim at the propagation of culture, being rather centers for the preservation of Magyar chauvinism". From 1926, he worked at the Physiological Institute in Bucharest.

Călugăreanu founded Știința tuturor ("Science for All") magazine in 1918. His research focused on neurophysiology, hematology, mineral metabolism and respiration. Among the phenomena he investigated were nerve compression, plasmolysis in cartilage cells, the electrical conductivity of plasma during coagulation, intestinal respiration in Misgurnus fossilis, respiration in certain gastropod genera (Limax, Helix, Planorbis, Lymnaea), functional particularities of the silk glands of the silkworm and the effect of light upon planarians. He published his results in numerous books, studies and articles that appeared in scientific publications domestically and abroad. In 1920, he was elected a corresponding member of the Romanian Academy. He was a commander of the Order of the Crown. He died on December 17, 1937.

His son was the mathematician Gheorghe Călugăreanu.
