= Poloidal–toroidal decomposition =

Technique in mathematics for representing solenoidal vector fields

In vector calculus, a topic in pure and applied mathematics, a poloidal–toroidal decomposition is a restricted form of the Helmholtz decomposition. It is often used in the spherical coordinates analysis of solenoidal vector fields, for example, magnetic fields and incompressible fluids.

== Definition ==
For a three-dimensional vector field F with zero divergence

$$\nabla \cdot \mathbf{F} = 0,$$

this $\mathbf{F}$ can be expressed as the sum of a toroidal field $\mathbf{T}$ and poloidal vector field $\mathbf{P}$

$$\mathbf{F} = \mathbf{T} + \mathbf{P}$$

where $\mathbf{r}$ is a radial vector in spherical coordinates $(r,\theta,\phi)$. The toroidal field is obtained from a scalar field,$\Psi(r,\theta,\phi)$, as the following curl,

$$\mathbf{T} = \nabla \times (\mathbf{r} \Psi(\mathbf{r}))$$

and the poloidal field is derived from another scalar field $\Phi(r,\theta, \phi)$, as a twice-iterated curl,

$$\mathbf{P} = \nabla \times (\nabla \times (\mathbf{r} \Phi (\mathbf{r})))\,.$$

This decomposition is symmetric in that the curl of a toroidal field is poloidal, and the curl of a poloidal field is toroidal, known as Chandrasekhar–Kendall function.

== Geometry ==
A toroidal vector field is tangential to spheres around the origin,

$$\mathbf{r} \cdot \mathbf{T} = 0$$

while the curl of a poloidal field is tangential to those spheres

$\mathbf{r} \cdot (\nabla \times \mathbf{P}) = 0.$

The poloidal–toroidal decomposition is unique if it is required that the average of the scalar fields Ψ and Φ vanishes on every sphere of radius r.

== Cartesian decomposition ==
A poloidal–toroidal decomposition also exists in Cartesian coordinates, but a mean-field flow has to be included in this case. For example, every solenoidal vector field can be written as

$$\mathbf{F}(x,y,z) = \nabla \times g(x,y,z) \hat{\mathbf{z}} + \nabla \times (\nabla \times h(x,y,z) \hat{\mathbf{z}}) + b_x(z) \hat{\mathbf{x}} + b_y(z)\hat{\mathbf{y}},$$

where $\hat{\mathbf{x}}, \hat{\mathbf{y}}, \hat{\mathbf{z}}$ denote the unit vectors in the coordinate directions.

== See also ==
- Chandrasekhar–Kendall function
- Toroidal and poloidal
