= Chandrasekhar–Kendall function =

Axisymmetric eigenfunctions

Chandrasekhar–Kendall functions are the eigenfunctions of the curl operator derived by Subrahmanyan Chandrasekhar and P. C. Kendall in 1957 while attempting to solve the force-free magnetic fields. The functions were independently derived by both, and the two decided to publish their findings in the same paper.

If the force-free magnetic field equation is written as $\nabla\times\mathbf{H}=\lambda\mathbf{H}$, where $\mathbf{H}$ is the magnetic field and $\lambda$ is the force-free parameter, with the assumption of divergence free field, $\nabla\cdot\mathbf{H}=0$, then the most general solution for the axisymmetric case is

$$\mathbf{H} = \frac{1}{\lambda}\nabla\times(\nabla\times\psi\mathbf{\hat n}) + \nabla \times \psi \mathbf{\hat n}$$

where $\mathbf{\hat n}$ is a unit vector and the scalar function $\psi$ satisfies the Helmholtz equation, i.e.,

$$\nabla^2\psi + \lambda^2\psi=0.$$

The same equation also appears in Beltrami flows from fluid dynamics where, the vorticity vector is parallel to the velocity vector, i.e., $\nabla\times\mathbf{v}=\lambda\mathbf{v}$.

== Derivation ==
Taking curl of the equation $\nabla\times\mathbf{H}=\lambda\mathbf{H}$ and using this same equation, we get

$$\nabla\times(\nabla\times\mathbf{H}) = \lambda^2\mathbf{H}$$.

In the vector identity $\nabla \times \left( \nabla \times \mathbf{H} \right) = \nabla(\nabla \cdot \mathbf{H}) - \nabla^{2}\mathbf{H}$, we can set $\nabla\cdot\mathbf{H}=0$ since it is solenoidal, which leads to a vector Helmholtz equation,

$$\nabla^2\mathbf{H}+\lambda^2\mathbf{H}=0$$.

Every solution of above equation is not the solution of original equation, but the converse is true. If $\psi$ is a scalar function which satisfies the equation $\nabla^2\psi + \lambda^2\psi=0$, then the three linearly independent solutions of the vector Helmholtz equation are given by

$$\mathbf{L} = \nabla\psi,\quad \mathbf{T} = \nabla\times\psi\mathbf{\hat n}, \quad \mathbf{S} = \frac{1}{\lambda}\nabla\times\mathbf{T}$$

where $\mathbf{\hat n}$ is a fixed unit vector. Since $\nabla\times\mathbf{S} =\lambda\mathbf{T}$, it can be found that $\nabla\times(\mathbf{S}+\mathbf{T})=\lambda(\mathbf{S}+\mathbf{T})$. But this is same as the original equation, therefore $\mathbf{H}=\mathbf{S}+\mathbf{T}$, where $\mathbf{S}$ is the poloidal field and $\mathbf{T}$ is the toroidal field. Thus, substituting $\mathbf{T}$ in $\mathbf{S}$, we get the most general solution as

$$\mathbf{H} = \frac{1}{\lambda}\nabla\times(\nabla\times\psi\mathbf{\hat n}) + \nabla \times \psi \mathbf{\hat n}.$$

== Cylindrical polar coordinates ==
Taking the unit vector in the $z$ direction, i.e., $\mathbf{\hat n}=\mathbf{e}_z$, with a periodicity $L$ in the $z$ direction with vanishing boundary conditions at $r=a$, the solution is given by

$$\psi = J_m(\mu_jr)e^{im\theta+ikz}, \quad \lambda =\pm(\mu_j^2+k^2)^{1/2}$$

where $J_m$ is the Bessel function, $k=\pm 2\pi n/L, \ n = 0,1,2,\ldots$, the integers $m =0,\pm 1,\pm 2,\ldots$ and $\mu_j$ is determined by the boundary condition $a k\mu_j J_m'(\mu_j a)+m \lambda J_m(\mu_j a) =0.$ The eigenvalues for $m=n=0$ has to be dealt separately. Since here $\mathbf{\hat n}=\mathbf{e}_z$, we can think of $z$ direction to be toroidal and $\theta$ direction to be poloidal, consistent with the convention.

== See also ==
- Poloidal–toroidal decomposition
- Woltjer's theorem
