= Significant tornado parameter =

American tornado prediction index

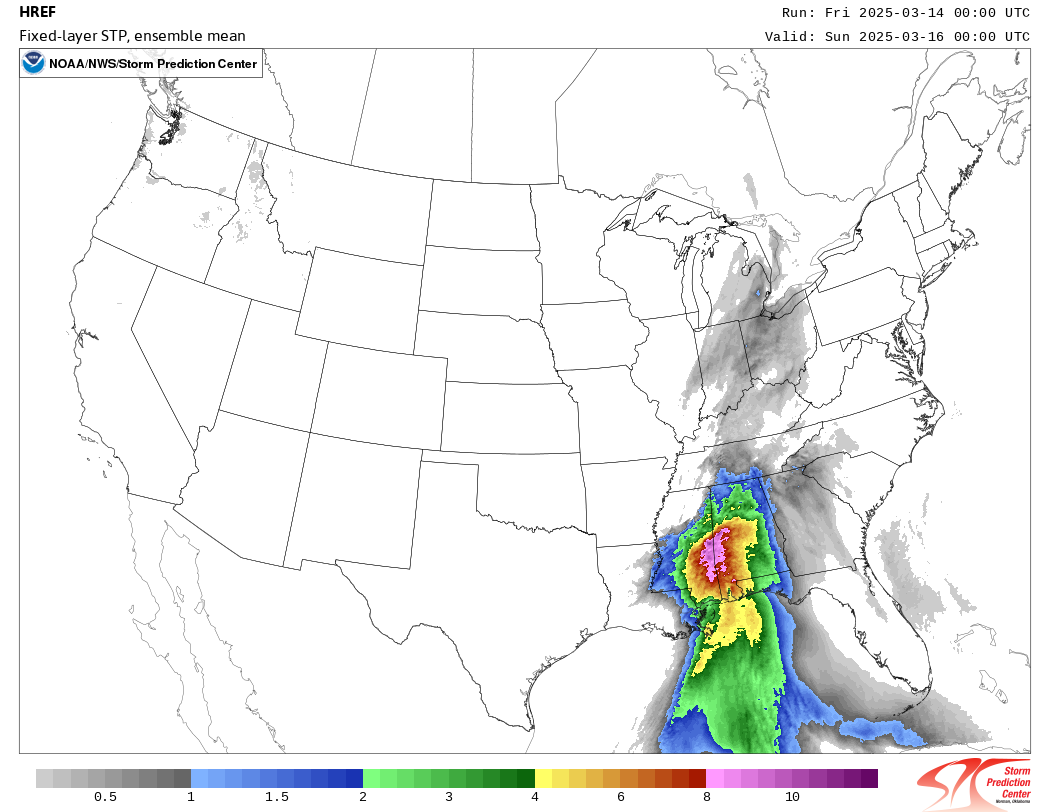
The Significant Tornado Parameter highlighting a risk for tornadoes across Mississippi and Alabama on March 15, 2025

The Significant Tornado Parameter, often abbreviated as STP or SigTor, is a composite index used by the Storm Prediction Center to highlight areas across the United States where multiple ingredients for the development of tornadic supercells overlap, and the capability of potential tornadic supercells producing "significant" tornadoes of EF2 intensity or higher. Values greater than 1 indicate an increased potential of significant tornadoes.

== Equation ==
The equation used to calculate the parameter is as follows:

STP = MLCAPE/(1500 J/Kg^-1) x (2000-mlLCL)/(1000 m) x ESRH/(150 m^2 s^-2) x EBWD/(20 m/s^-1) x (200+mlCIN)/(150 J/Kg^-1)

== See also ==
- Tornado intensity
- Convective available potential energy
