= Structural complexity (applied mathematics) =

Structural complexity is a science of applied mathematics that aims to relate fundamental physical or biological aspects of a complex system with the mathematical description of the morphological complexity that the system exhibits, by establishing rigorous relations between mathematical and physical properties of such system.

Structural complexity emerges from all systems that display morphological organization. Filamentary structures, for instance, are an example of coherent structures that emerge, interact and evolve in many physical and biological systems, such as mass distribution in the Universe, vortex filaments in turbulent flows, neural networks in our brain and genetic material (such as DNA) in a cell. In general information on the degree of morphological disorder present in the system tells us something important about fundamental physical or biological processes.

Structural complexity methods are based on applications of differential geometry and topology (and in particular knot theory) to interpret physical properties of dynamical systems. such as relations between kinetic energy and tangles of vortex filaments in a turbulent flow or magnetic energy and braiding of magnetic fields in the solar corona, including aspects of topological fluid dynamics.

== Literature ==
- Abraham, Ralph; Shaw, C.D. (1992). Dynamics--the geometry of behavior. Redwood City, Calif: Addison-Wesley, Advanced Book Program. ISBN 978-0-201-56717-5. OCLC 24374484.
- Nicolis, G (1989). Exploring complexity : an introduction. New York: W.H. Freeman. ISBN 978-0-7167-1859-8. OCLC 18989681.
- Ricca, R.L. (2005). "Structural complexity". In A. Scott (ed.). Encyclopedia of Nonlinear Science. Routledge, New York and London. pp. 885–887. ISBN 9781579583859.
- Ricca, R.L. (2009). "Detecting structural complexity: from visiometrics to genomics and brain research". In M. Emmer & A. Quarteroni (ed.). Mathknow. Springer-Verlag. pp. 167–181. ISBN 9788847011212.
