= Lodewijk Woltjer =

Dutch astronomer (1930–2019)

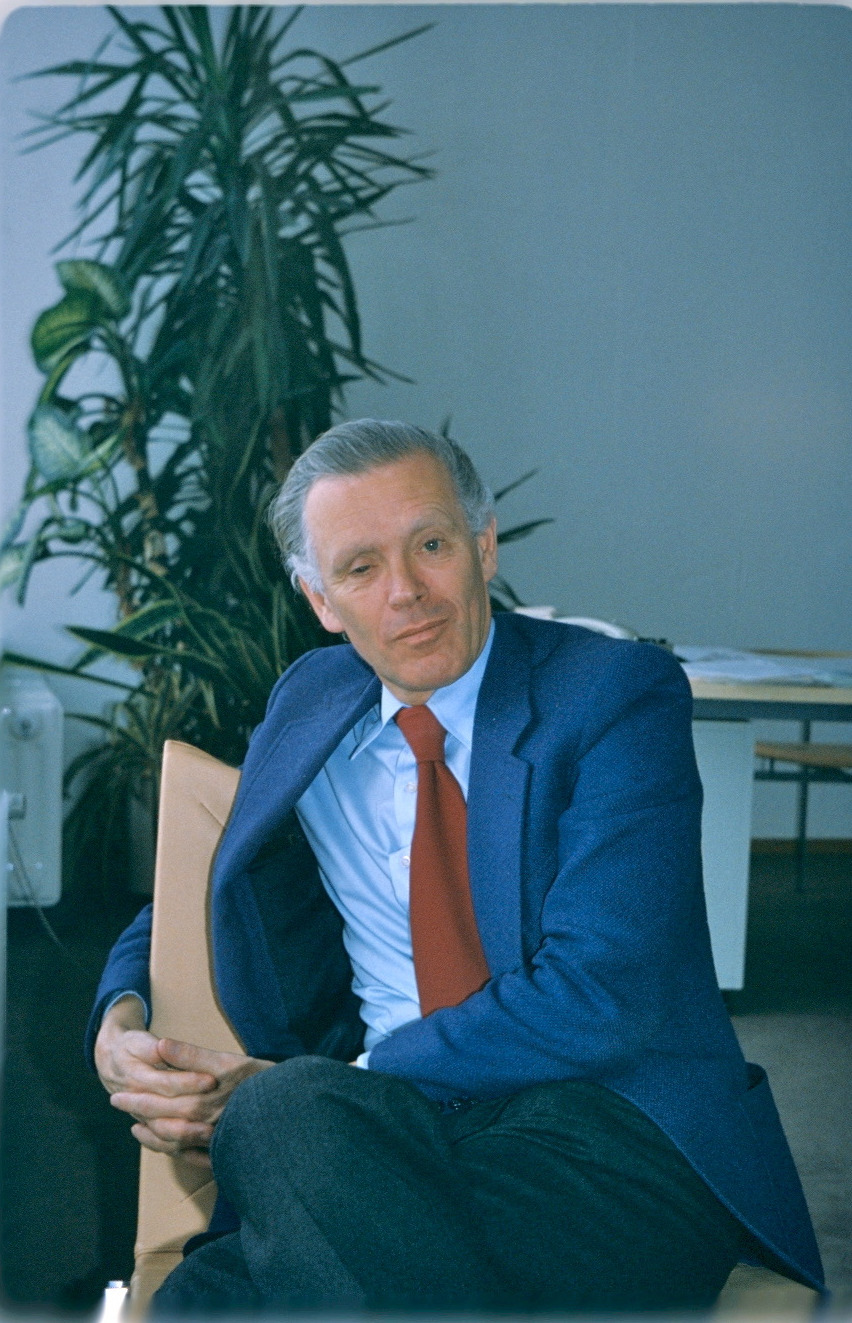
- Woltjer in 1981

1st President of the European Astronomical Society
- In office 1990 – 21 August 1993
- Succeeded by: Paul Murdin

Personal details
- Born: 26 April 1930 Noordwijk, Netherlands
- Died: 25 August 2019 (aged 89) Geneva
- Scientific career
- Education: University of Leiden
- Known for: Woltjer's theorem
- Awards: Karl Schwarzschild Medal (1987)
- Fields: Astronomy
- Doctoral advisor: Jan Oort

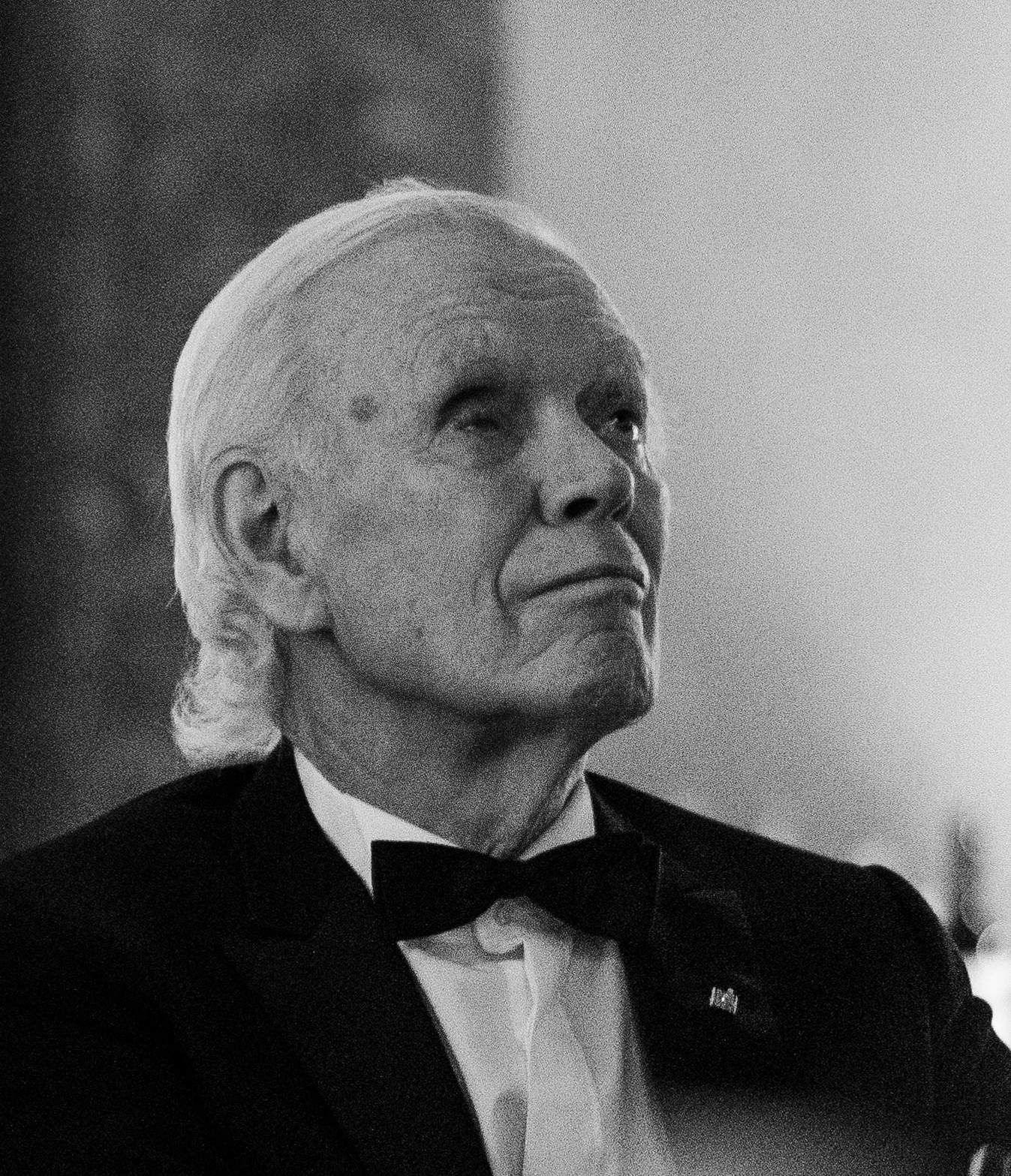
Woltjer at the European Southern Observatory 50th anniversary gala, Residenz, Munich, 11 October 2012

Lodewijk Woltjer (26 April 1930 – 25 August 2019) was an astronomer, and the son of astronomer Jan Woltjer. He studied at the University of Leiden under Jan Oort earning a PhD in astronomy in 1957 with a thesis on the Crab Nebula. This was followed by post-doctoral research appointments to various American universities and the subsequent appointment of professor of theoretical astrophysics and plasma physics in the University of Leiden. From 1964 to 1974 he was Rutherfurd Professor of Astronomy and Chair of the Astronomy Department at Columbia University in New York. From 1975 to 1987 he was Director General of the European Southern Observatory (ESO), where he initiated the construction of the Very Large Telescope. In 1994–1997 he was President of the International Astronomical Union. Woltjer was honored in 1987 with the Karl Schwarzschild Medal.

He was the first Editor-in-Chief of The Astronomy and Astrophysics Review, inaugurated in 1989; and also the Editor of the Astronomical Journal in 1967 to 1974.

Dr. Woltjer has been honored by membership in a number of European Academies of Sciences, including Belgian, British, Dutch, French, and Swedish.
