= Magnetic helicity =

Measure of magnetic field topology

In plasma physics, magnetic helicity is a measure of the linkage, twist, and writhe of a magnetic field.

Magnetic helicity is a useful concept in the analysis of systems with extremely low resistivity, such as astrophysical systems. When resistivity is low, magnetic helicity is conserved over longer timescales, to a good approximation. Magnetic helicity dynamics are particularly important in analyzing solar flares and coronal mass ejections. Magnetic helicity is relevant in the dynamics of the solar wind. Its conservation is significant in dynamo processes, and it also plays a role in fusion research, such as reversed field pinch experiments.

When a magnetic field contains magnetic helicity, it tends to form large-scale structures from small-scale ones. This process can be referred to as an inverse transfer in Fourier space. This property of increasing the scale of structures makes magnetic helicity special in three dimensions, as other three-dimensional flows in ordinary fluid mechanics are the opposite, being turbulent and having the tendency to "destroy" structure, in the sense that large-scale vortices break up into smaller ones, until dissipating through viscous effects into heat. Through a parallel but inverted process, the opposite happens for magnetic vortices, where small helical structures with non-zero magnetic helicity combine and form large-scale magnetic fields. This is visible in the dynamics of the heliospheric current sheet, a large magnetic structure in the Solar System.

== Mathematical definition ==
Generally, the helicity $H^{\mathbf f}$ of a smooth vector field $\mathbf f$ confined to a volume $V$ is the standard measure of the extent to which the field lines wrap and coil around one another. It is defined as the volume integral over $V$ of the scalar product of $\mathbf f$ and its curl, $\nabla\times{\mathbf f}$:
$$H^{\mathbf f} = \int_V {\mathbf f} \cdot \left(\nabla\times{\mathbf f}\right)\ dV .$$

=== Magnetic helicity ===
Magnetic helicity $H^{\mathbf M}$ is the helicity of a magnetic vector potential ${\mathbf A}$ where $\nabla \times {\mathbf A}={\mathbf B}$ is the associated magnetic field confined to a volume $V$. Magnetic helicity can then be expressed as
$$H^{\mathbf M} = \int_V {\mathbf A}\cdot{\mathbf B}\ dV .$$

Since the magnetic vector potential is not gauge invariant, the magnetic helicity is also not gauge invariant in general. As a consequence, the magnetic helicity of a physical system cannot be measured directly. In certain conditions and under certain assumptions, one can however measure the current helicity of a system and from it, when further conditions are fulfilled and under further assumptions, deduce the magnetic helicity.

Magnetic helicity has units of magnetic flux squared: Wb^{2} (webers squared) in SI units and Mx^{2} (maxwells squared) in Gaussian Units.

=== Current helicity ===
The current helicity, or helicity $M^{\mathbf{J}}$ of the magnetic field $\mathbf{B}$ confined to a volume $V$, can be expressed as
$$H^{\mathbf J} = \int_V {\mathbf B}\cdot{\mathbf J}\ dV$$
where ${\mathbf J} = \nabla \times {\mathbf B}$ is the current density. Unlike magnetic helicity, current helicity is not an ideal invariant (it is not conserved even when the electrical resistivity is zero).

== Gauge considerations ==
Magnetic helicity is a gauge-dependent quantity, because $\mathbf A$ can be redefined by adding a gradient to it (gauge choosing). However, for perfectly conducting boundaries or periodic systems without a net magnetic flux, the magnetic helicity contained in the whole domain is gauge invariant, that is, independent of the gauge choice. A gauge-invariant relative helicity has been defined for volumes with non-zero magnetic flux on their boundary surfaces.

== Topological interpretation ==
The name "helicity" is because the trajectory of a fluid particle in a fluid with velocity $\boldsymbol v$ and vorticity $\boldsymbol{\omega}=\nabla \times \boldsymbol{v}$ forms a helix in regions where the kinetic helicity $\textstyle H^K=\int \mathbf v \cdot \boldsymbol{\omega} dV \neq 0$. When $\textstyle H^K > 0$, the resulting helix is right-handed and when $\textstyle H^K < 0$ it is left-handed. This behavior is very similar to that found concerning magnetic field lines.

Regions where magnetic helicity is not zero can also contain other sorts of magnetic structures, such as helical magnetic field lines. Magnetic helicity is a continuous generalization of the topological concept of linking number to the differential quantities required to describe the magnetic field. Where linking numbers describe how many times curves are interlinked, magnetic helicity describes how many magnetic field lines are interlinked.

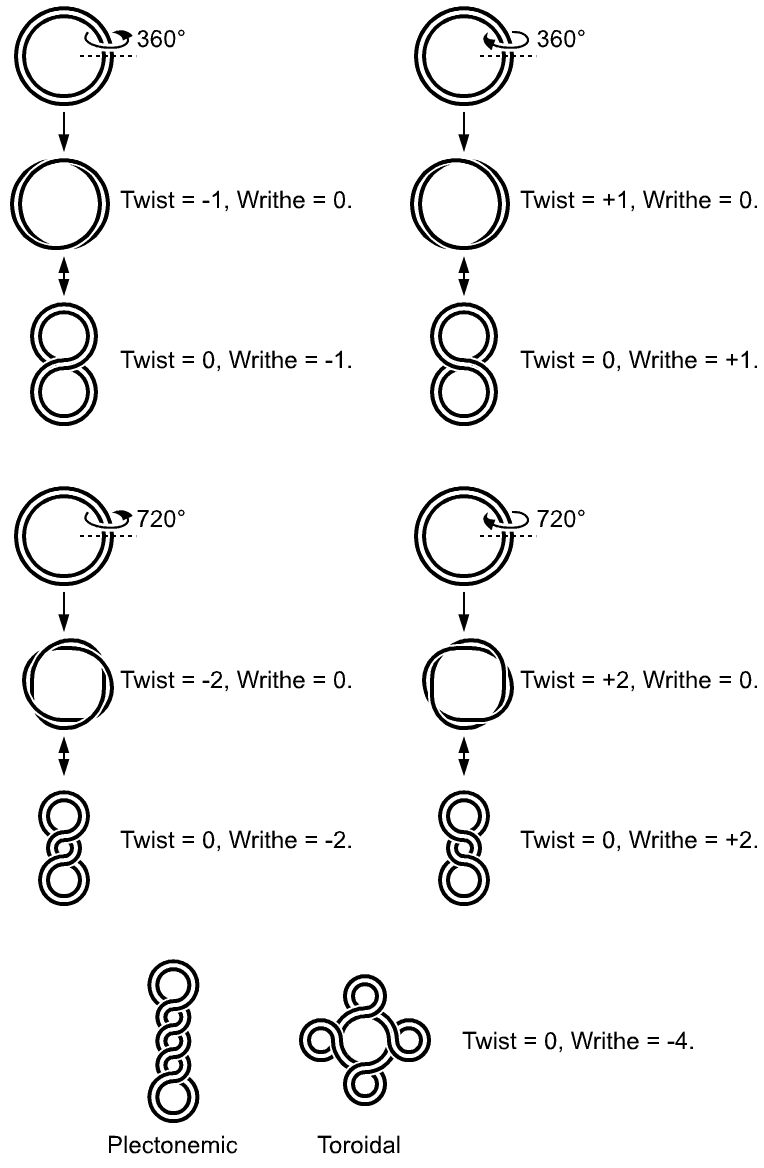
Examples of curves with varying values of writhe and twist. Magnetic helicity measures the sum of these two quantities for magnetic field lines. The sum is conserved under all transformations where curves are not cut or joined.

Magnetic helicity is proportional to the sum of the topological quantities twist and writhe for magnetic field lines. The twist is the rotation of the flux tube around its axis, and writhe is the rotation of the flux tube axis itself. Topological transformations can change twist and writhe numbers, but conserve their sum. As magnetic flux tubes (collections of closed magnetic field line loops) tend to resist crossing each other in magnetohydrodynamic fluids, magnetic helicity is very well-conserved.

As with many quantities in electromagnetism, magnetic helicity is closely related to fluid mechanical helicity, the corresponding quantity for fluid flow lines, and their dynamics are interlinked.

== Properties ==
=== Ideal quadratic invariance ===
In the late 1950s, Lodewijk Woltjer and Walter M. Elsässer discovered independently the ideal invariance of magnetic helicity, that is, its conservation when resistivity is zero. Woltjer's proof, valid for a closed system, is repeated in the following:

In ideal magnetohydrodynamics, the time evolution of a magnetic field and magnetic vector potential can be expressed using the induction equation as
$$\frac{\partial {\mathbf B}}{\partial t} = \nabla \times ({\mathbf v} \times {\mathbf B}),\quad \frac{\partial {\mathbf A}}{\partial t} =  {\mathbf v} \times {\mathbf B} + \nabla\Phi,$$
respectively, where $\nabla\Phi$ is a scalar potential given by the gauge condition (see § Gauge considerations). Choosing the gauge so that the scalar potential vanishes, $\nabla \Phi = \mathbf{0}$, the time evolution of magnetic helicity in a volume $V$ is given by:
$$\begin{align}
\frac{\partial H^{\mathbf M}}{\partial t} &= \int_V \left( \frac{\partial {\mathbf A}}{\partial t} \cdot {\mathbf B} + {\mathbf A} \cdot \frac{\partial {\mathbf B}}{\partial t} \right) dV \\
&= \int_V ({\mathbf v} \times {\mathbf B}) \cdot{\mathbf B}\ dV  + \int_V {\mathbf A} \cdot \left(\nabla \times \frac{\partial {\mathbf A}}{\partial t}\right) dV .
\end{align}$$
The dot product in the integrand of the first term is zero since ${\mathbf B}$ is orthogonal to the cross product ${\mathbf v} \times {\mathbf B}$, and the second term can be integrated by parts to give
$$\frac{\partial H^{\mathbf M}}{\partial t} = \int_V \left(\nabla \times {\mathbf A}\right) \cdot \frac{\partial {\mathbf A}}{\partial t}\ dV + \int_{\partial V} \left({\mathbf A} \times \frac{\partial {\mathbf A}}{\partial t}\right) \cdot d\mathbf{S}$$
where the second term is a surface integral over the boundary surface $\partial V$ of the closed system. The dot product in the integrand of the first term is zero because $\nabla \times {\mathbf A} = {\mathbf B}$ is orthogonal to $\partial {\mathbf A}/\partial t .$ The second term also vanishes because motions inside the closed system cannot affect the vector potential outside, so that at the boundary surface $\partial {\mathbf A}/\partial t = \mathbf{0}$ since the magnetic vector potential is a continuous function. Therefore,
$$\frac{\partial H^{\mathbf M}}{\partial t} = 0 ,$$
and magnetic helicity is ideally conserved. In all situations where magnetic helicity is gauge invariant, magnetic helicity is ideally conserved without the need for the specific gauge choice $\nabla \Phi = \mathbf{0} .$

Magnetic helicity remains conserved in a good approximation even with a small but finite resistivity, in which case magnetic reconnection dissipates energy.

=== Inverse transfer ===
Small-scale helical structures tend to form larger and larger magnetic structures. This can be called an inverse transfer in Fourier space, as opposed to the (direct) energy cascade in three-dimensional turbulent hydrodynamical flows. The possibility of such an inverse transfer was first proposed by Uriel Frisch and collaborators and has been verified through many numerical experiments. As a consequence, the presence of magnetic helicity is a possibility to explain the existence and sustainment of large-scale magnetic structures in the Universe.

An argument for this inverse transfer taken from is repeated here, which is based on the so-called "realizability condition" on the magnetic helicity Fourier spectrum $\hat{H}^M_{\mathbf k} = \hat{\mathbf A}^*_{\mathbf k} \cdot \hat{\mathbf B}_{\mathbf k}$ (where $\hat{\mathbf B}_{\mathbf k}$ is the Fourier coefficient at the wavevector ${\mathbf k}$ of the magnetic field ${\mathbf B}$, and similarly for $\hat{\mathbf A}$, the star denoting the complex conjugate). The "realizability condition" corresponds to an application of Cauchy-Schwarz inequality, which yields:
$$\left|\hat{H}^M_{\mathbf k}\right| \leq \frac{2E^M_{\mathbf k}}{|{\mathbf k}|} ,$$
with $E^M_{\mathbf k} = \frac{1}{2} \hat{\mathbf B}^*_{\mathbf k}\cdot\hat{\mathbf B}_{\mathbf k}$ the magnetic energy spectrum. To obtain this inequality, the fact that $|\hat{\mathbf B}_{\mathbf k}|=|{\mathbf k}||\hat{\mathbf A}^\perp_{\mathbf k}|$ (with $\hat{\mathbf A}^\perp_{\mathbf k}$ the solenoidal part of the Fourier transformed magnetic vector potential, orthogonal to the wavevector in Fourier space) has been used, since $\hat{\mathbf{B}}_{\mathbf k} = i {\mathbf k} \times \hat{\mathbf{A}}_{\mathbf k}$. The factor 2 is not present in the paper since the magnetic helicity is defined there alternatively as $\frac{1}{2} \int_V {\mathbf A} \cdot {\mathbf B}\ dV$.

One can then imagine an initial situation with no velocity field and a magnetic field only present at two wavevectors $\mathbf p$ and $\mathbf q$. We assume a fully helical magnetic field, which means that it saturates the realizability condition: $\left|\hat{H}^M_{\mathbf p}\right| = \frac{2E^M_{\mathbf p}}{|{\mathbf p}|}$ and $\left|\hat{H}^M_{\mathbf q}\right| = \frac{2E^M_{\mathbf q}}{|{\mathbf q}|}$. Assuming that all the energy and magnetic helicity transfers are done to another wavevector $\mathbf k$, the conservation of magnetic helicity on the one hand and of the total energy $E^T = E^M + E^K$ (the sum of magnetic and kinetic energy) on the other hand gives:

$$H^M_{\mathbf k} = H^M_{\mathbf p} + H^M_{\mathbf q},$$

$$E^T_{\mathbf k} = E^T_{\mathbf p}+E^T_{\mathbf q} = E^M_{\mathbf p}+E^M_{\mathbf q}.$$

The second equality for energy comes from the fact that we consider an initial state with no kinetic energy. Then we have the necessarily $|\mathbf k| \leq \max(|\mathbf p|, |\mathbf q| )$. Indeed, if we would have $|\mathbf k| > \max(|\mathbf p|,|\mathbf q| )$, then:

$$H^M_{\mathbf k} = H^M_{\mathbf p} + H^M_{\mathbf q} = \frac{2E^M_{\mathbf p}}{|\mathbf p|} + \frac{2E^M_{\mathbf q}}{|\mathbf q|} > \frac{2\left(E^M_{\mathbf p} + E^M_{\mathbf q}\right)}{|\mathbf k|} = \frac{2E^T_{\mathbf k}}{|\mathbf k|} \geq \frac{2E^M_{\mathbf k}}{|\mathbf k|},$$

which would break the realizability condition. This means that $|\mathbf k| \leq \max(|\mathbf p|,|\mathbf q| )$. In particular, for $|{\mathbf p}| = |{\mathbf q}|$, the magnetic helicity is transferred to a smaller wavevector, which means to larger scales.

== See also ==
- Woltjer's theorem
