= DNA supercoil =

Amount of twist in a particular DNA strand

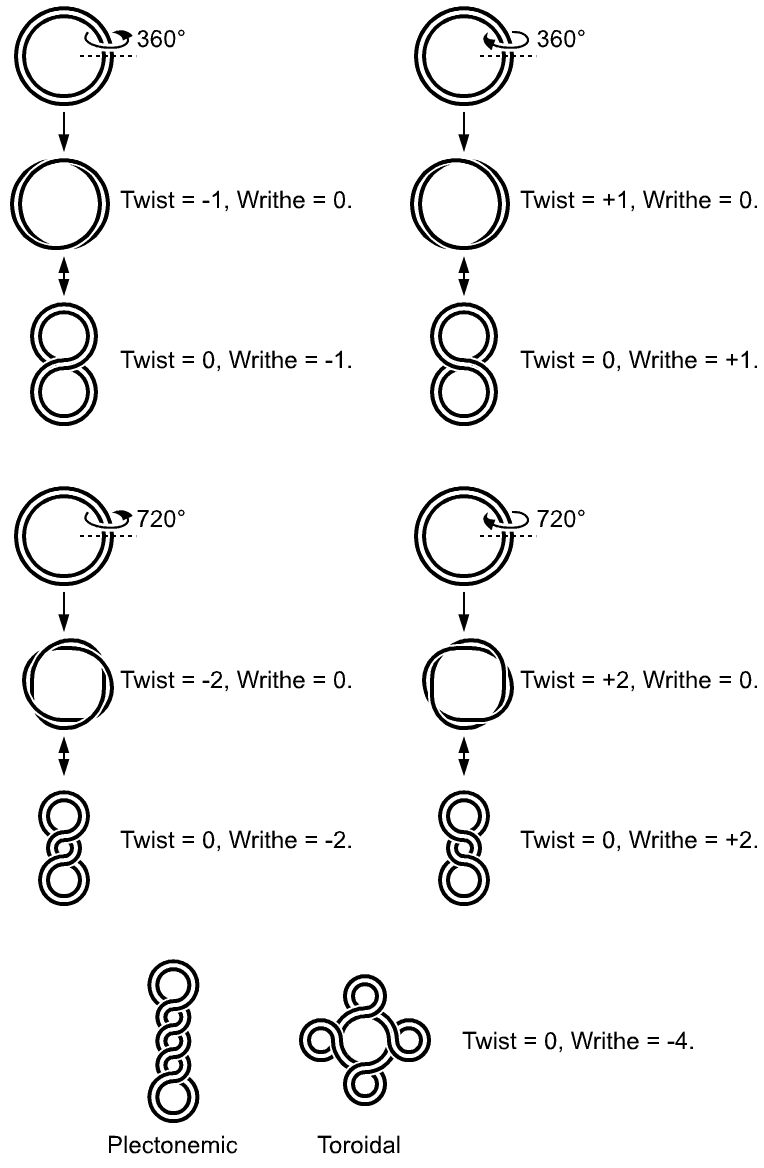
Supercoiled structure of circular DNA molecules with low writhe. The helical nature of the DNA duplex is omitted for clarity.

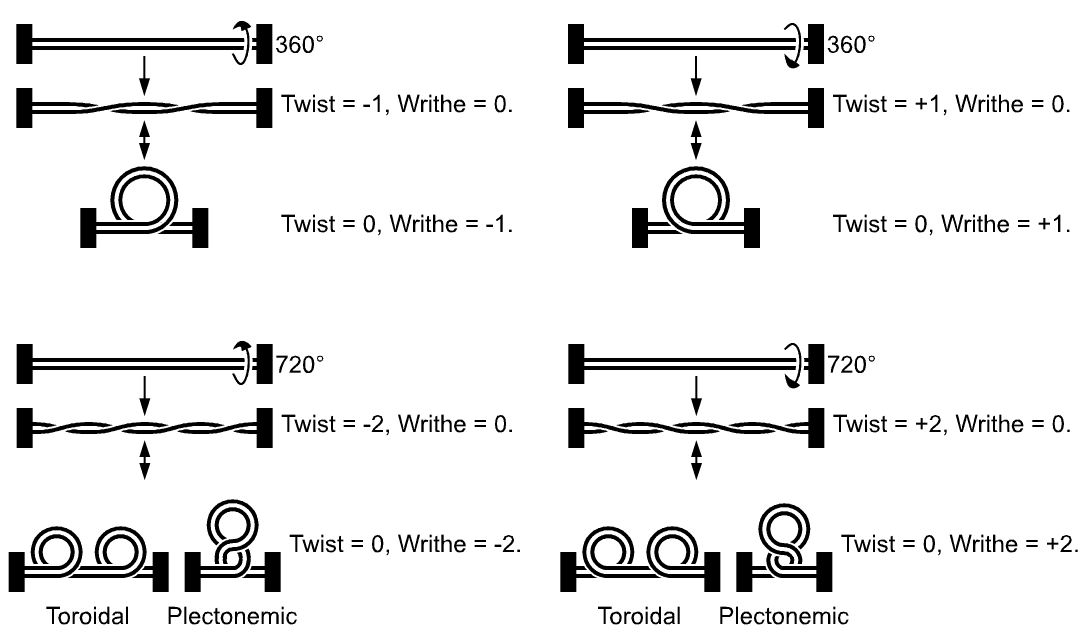
Supercoiled structure of linear DNA molecules with constrained ends. The helical nature of the DNA duplex is omitted for clarity.

DNA supercoiling refers to the amount of twist in a particular DNA strand, which determines the amount of strain on it. A given strand may be "positively supercoiled" or "negatively supercoiled" (more or less tightly wound). The amount of a strand's supercoiling affects a number of biological processes, such as compacting DNA and regulating access to the genetic code (which strongly affects DNA metabolism and possibly gene expression). Certain enzymes, such as topoisomerases, change the amount of DNA supercoiling to facilitate functions such as DNA replication and transcription. The amount of supercoiling in a given strand is described by a mathematical formula that compares it to a reference state known as "relaxed B-form" DNA.

== Overview ==
In a "relaxed" double-helical segment of B-DNA, the two strands twist around the helical axis once every 10.4–10.5 base pairs of sequence. Adding or subtracting twists, as some enzymes do, imposes strain. If a DNA segment under twist strain is closed into a circle by joining its two ends, and then allowed to move freely, it takes on different shape, such as a figure-eight. This shape is referred to as a supercoil. (The noun form "supercoil" is often used when describing DNA topology.)

The DNA of most organisms is usually negatively supercoiled. It becomes temporarily positively supercoiled when it is being replicated or transcribed. These processes are inhibited (regulated) if it is not promptly relaxed. The simplest shape of a supercoil is a figure eight; a circular DNA strand assumes this shape to accommodate more or few helical twists. The two lobes of the figure eight will appear rotated either clockwise or counterclockwise with respect to one another, depending on whether the helix is over- or underwound. For each additional helical twist being accommodated, the lobes will show one more rotation about their axis.

Lobal contortions of a circular DNA, such as the rotation of the figure-eight lobes above, are referred to as writhe. The above example illustrates that twist and writhe are interconvertible. Supercoiling can be represented mathematically by the sum of twist and writhe. The twist is the number of helical turns in the DNA and the writhe is the number of times the double helix crosses over on itself (these are the supercoils). Extra helical twists are positive and lead to positive supercoiling, while subtractive twisting causes negative supercoiling. Many topoisomerase enzymes sense supercoiling and either generate or dissipate it as they change DNA topology.

In part because chromosomes may be very large, segments in the middle may act as if their ends are anchored. As a result, they may be unable to distribute excess twist to the rest of the chromosome or to absorb twist to recover from underwinding—the segments may become supercoiled, in other words. In response to supercoiling, they will assume an amount of writhe, just as if their ends were joined.

Supercoiled DNA forms two structures; a plectoneme or a toroid, or a combination of both. A negatively supercoiled DNA molecule will produce either a one-start left-handed helix, the toroid, or a two-start right-handed helix with terminal loops, the plectoneme. Plectonemes are typically more common in nature, and this is the shape most bacterial plasmids will take. For larger molecules it is common for hybrid structures to form – a loop on a toroid can extend into a plectoneme. If all the loops on a toroid extend then it becomes a branch point in the plectonemic structure. DNA supercoiling is important for DNA packaging within all cells, and seems to also play a role in gene expression.

== Intercalation-induced supercoiling of DNA ==
Based on the properties of intercalating molecules, i.e. fluorescing upon binding to DNA and unwinding of DNA base-pairs, in 2016, a single-molecule technique has been introduced to directly visualize individual plectonemes along supercoiled DNA which would further allow to study the interactions of DNA processing proteins with supercoiled DNA. In that study, Sytox Orange (an intercalating dye) was used to induce supercoiling on surface tethered DNA molecules.

Using this assay, it was found that the DNA sequence encodes for the position of plectonemic supercoils. Furthermore, DNA supercoils were found to be enriched at the transcription start sites in prokaryotes.

== Functions ==
=== Genome packaging ===
DNA supercoiling is important for DNA packaging within all cells. Because the length of DNA can be thousands of times that of a cell, packaging this genetic material into the cell or nucleus (in eukaryotes) is a difficult feat. Supercoiling of DNA reduces the space and allows for DNA to be packaged. In prokaryotes, plectonemic supercoils are predominant, because of the circular chromosome and relatively small amount of genetic material. In eukaryotes, DNA supercoiling exists on many levels of both plectonemic and solenoidal supercoils, with the solenoidal supercoiling proving most effective in compacting the DNA. Solenoidal supercoiling is achieved with histones to form a 10 nm fiber. This fiber is further coiled into a 30 nm fiber, and further coiled upon itself numerous times more.

DNA packaging is greatly increased during mitosis when duplicated sister DNAs are segregated into daughter cells. It has been shown that condensin, a large protein complex that plays a central role in mitotic chromosome assembly, induces positive supercoils in an ATP hydrolysis-dependent manner in vitro. Supercoiling could also play an important role during interphase in the formation and maintenance of topologically associating domains (TADs).

Supercoiling is also required for DNA/RNA synthesis. Because DNA must be unwound for DNA/RNA polymerase action, supercoils are generated. The region ahead of the polymerase complex will be unwound; this stress is compensated with positive supercoils ahead of the complex. Behind the complex, DNA is rewound and there will be compensatory negative supercoils. Topoisomerases such as DNA gyrase (Type II Topoisomerase) play a role in relieving some of the stress during DNA/RNA synthesis.

In many bacterial species, barriers to supercoil diffusion divide the genome into a series of topologically isolated supercoil domains (SDs). These SDs play a major role in organizing the nucleoid. SDs negatively supercoiled on average but can sometimes be positively supercoiled as well. The degree of supercoiling can vary in response to different forms of stress and influences the binding of different nucleoid associated proteins (NAPs) that further organize the bacterial genome. For example, Dps from E. coli has been shown to bind supercoiled DNA much more rapidly that torsionally relaxed DNA.

=== Gene expression ===
Specialized proteins can unzip small segments of the DNA molecule when it is replicated or transcribed into RNA. But work published in 2015 illustrates how DNA opens on its own.

Simply twisting DNA can expose internal bases to the outside, without the aid of any proteins. Also, transcription itself contorts DNA in living human cells, tightening some parts of the coil and loosening it in others. That stress triggers changes in shape, most notably opening up the helix to be read. Unfortunately, these interactions are very difficult to study because biological molecules morph shapes so easily. In 2008 it was noted that transcription twists DNA, leaving a trail of undercoiled (or negatively supercoiled) DNA in its wake. Moreover, they discovered that the DNA sequence itself affects how the molecule responds to supercoiling.

For example, the researchers identified a specific sequence of DNA that regulates transcription speed; as the amount of supercoil rises and falls, it slows or speeds the pace at which molecular machinery reads DNA. It is hypothesized that these structural changes might trigger stress elsewhere along its length, which in turn might provide trigger points for replication or gene expression. This implies that it is a very dynamic process in which both DNA and proteins each influences how the other acts and reacts.

=== Gene expression during cold shock ===
Almost half of the genes of the bacterium E. coli that are repressed during cold shock are similarly repressed when Gyrase is blocked by the antibiotic Novobiocin. Moreover, during cold shocks, the density of nucleoids increases, and the protein gyrase and the nucleoid become colocalized (which is consistent with a reduction in DNA relaxation). This is evidence that the reduction of negative supercoiling of the DNA is one of the main mechanisms responsible for the blocking of transcription of half of the genes that conduct the cold shock transcriptional response program of bacteria. Based on this, a stochastic model of this process has been proposed. This model is illustrated in the figure, where reaction 1 represent transcription and its locking due to supercoiling. Meanwhile, reactions 2 to 4 model, respectively, translation, and RNA and protein degradation.

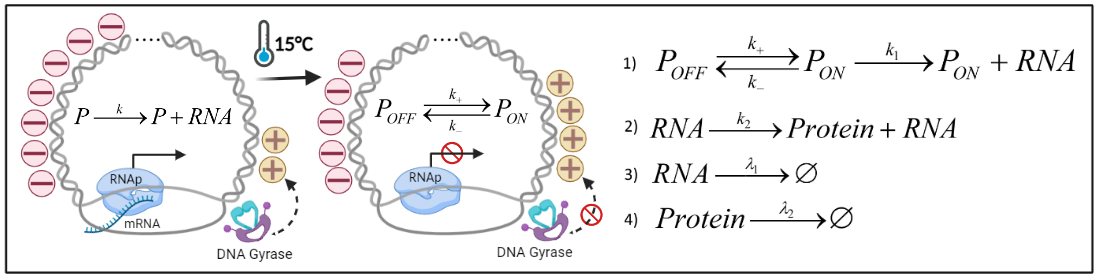
Illustration of how cold shock affects the supercoiling state of the DNA, by blocking the activity of Gyrase. The signs ' − ' and '+' represent negative and positive supercoiling, respectively. Also shown is a stochastic model of gene expression during cold shock as a function of the global DNA supercoiling state. The transition from ON to OFF of the promoter (P) causes the locking of transcription (i.e. RNA production). When ON, the promoter can produce RNA, from which proteins can be produced. RNA and proteins are always subject to degradation or dilution due to cell division.

== Mathematical description ==
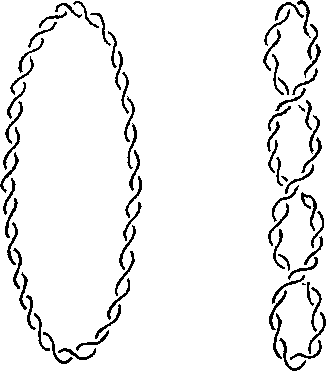
Drawing showing the difference between a circular DNA chromosome (a plasmid) with a secondary helical twist only, and one containing an additional tertiary superhelical twist superimposed on the secondary helical winding.

In nature, circular DNA is always isolated as a higher-order helix-upon-a-helix, known as a superhelix. In discussions of this subject, the Watson–Crick twist is referred to as a "secondary" winding, and the superhelices as a "tertiary" winding. The sketch on the left indicates a "relaxed", or "open circular" Watson–Crick double-helix, and, next to it, a right-handed superhelix. The "relaxed" structure on the left is not found unless the chromosome is nicked; the superhelix is the form usually found in nature.

For purposes of mathematical computations, a right-handed superhelix is defined as having a "negative" number of superhelical turns, and a left-handed superhelix is defined as having a "positive" number of superhelical turns. In the drawing (shown at the right), both the secondary (i.e., "Watson–Crick") winding and the tertiary (i.e., "superhelical") winding are right-handed, hence the supertwists are negative (–3 in this example).

The superhelicity is presumed to be a result of underwinding, meaning that there is a deficiency in the number of secondary Watson–Crick twists. Such a chromosome will be strained, just as a macroscopic metal spring is strained when it is either overwound or unwound. In DNA which is thusly strained, supertwists will appear.

DNA supercoiling can be described numerically by changes in the linking number Lk. The linking number is the most descriptive property of supercoiled DNA. Lk_{o}, the number of turns in the relaxed (B type) DNA plasmid/molecule, is determined by dividing the total base pairs of the molecule by the relaxed bp/turn which, depending on reference is 10.4; 10.5; 10.6.

$$Lk_o=bp/10.4$$

Lk is the number of crosses a single strand makes across the other, often visualized as the number of Watson–Crick twists found in a circular chromosome in a (usually imaginary) planar projection. This number is physically "locked in" at the moment of covalent closure of the chromosome, and cannot be altered without strand breakage.

The topology of the DNA is described by the equation below in which the linking number is equivalent to the sum of Tw, which is the number of twists or turns of the double helix, and Wr, which is the number of coils or "writhes." If there is a closed DNA molecule, the sum of Tw and Wr, or the linking number, does not change. However, there may be complementary changes in Tw and Wr without changing their sum:

$$Lk=Tw+Wr$$

Tw, called "twist," is the number of Watson–Crick twists in the chromosome when it is not constrained to lie in a plane. We have already seen that native DNA is usually found to be superhelical. If one goes around the superhelically twisted chromosome, counting secondary Watson–Crick twists, that number will be different from the number counted when the chromosome is constrained to lie flat. In general, the number of secondary twists in the native, supertwisted chromosome is expected to be the "normal" Watson–Crick winding number, meaning a single 10-base-pair helical twist for every 34 Å of DNA length.

Wr, called "writhe," is the number of superhelical twists. Since biological circular DNA is usually underwound, Lk will generally be less than Tw, which means that Wr will typically be negative.

If DNA is underwound, it will be under strain, exactly as a metal spring is strained when forcefully unwound, and that the appearance of supertwists will allow the chromosome to relieve its strain by taking on negative supertwists, which correct the secondary underwinding in accordance with the topology equation above.

The topology equation shows that there is a one-to-one relationship between changes in Tw and Wr. For example, if a secondary "Watson–Crick" twist is removed, then a right-handed supertwist must have been removed simultaneously (or, if the chromosome is relaxed, with no supertwists, then a left-handed supertwist must be added).

The change in the linking number, ΔLk, is the actual number of turns in the plasmid/molecule, Lk, minus the number of turns in the relaxed plasmid/molecule Lk_{o}:

$$\Delta Lk = Lk - Lk_o$$

If the DNA is negatively supercoiled, $\Delta Lk < 0$. The negative supercoiling implies that the DNA is underwound.

A standard expression independent of the molecule size is the "specific linking difference" or "superhelical density" denoted σ, which represents the number of turns added or removed relative to the total number of turns in the relaxed molecule/plasmid, indicating the level of supercoiling.

$$\sigma=\Delta{Lk/Lk_o}$$

The Gibbs free energy associated with the coiling is given by the equation below

$${\Delta G/N=10RT \sigma^2}$$

The difference in Gibbs free energy between the supercoiled circular DNA and uncoiled circular DNA with N > 2000 bp is approximated by:

$$\Delta G/N = 700\,\text{Kcal}/bp * (\Delta Lk/N)$$

or, 16 cal/bp.

Since the linking number L of supercoiled DNA is the number of times the two strands are intertwined (and both strands remain covalently intact), L cannot change. The reference state (or parameter) L_{0} of a circular DNA duplex is its relaxed state. In this state, its writhe W = 0. Since L = T + W, in a relaxed state T = L. Thus, if we have a 400 bp relaxed circular DNA duplex, L ~ 40 (assuming ~10 bp per turn in B-DNA). Then T ~ 40.

- Positively supercoiling:
  T = 0, W = 0, then L = 0
  T = +3, W = 0, then L = +3
  T = +2, W = +1, then L = +3
- Negatively supercoiling:
  T = 0, W = 0, then L = 0
  T = -3, W = 0, then L = -3
  T = -2, W = -1, then L = -3

Negative supercoils favor local unwinding of the DNA, allowing processes such as transcription, DNA replication, and recombination. Negative supercoiling is also thought to favour the transition between B-DNA and Z-DNA, and moderate the interactions of DNA binding proteins involved in gene regulation.

== Stochastic models ==
Some stochastic models have been proposed to account for the effects of positive supercoiling buildup (PSB) in gene expression dynamics (e.g. in bacterial gene expression), differing in, e.g., the level of detail. In general, the detail increases when adding processes affected by and affecting supercoiling. As this addition occurs, the complexity of the model increases.

For example, in two models of different complexity are proposed. In the most detailed one, events were modeled at the nucleotide level, while in the other the events were modeled at the promoter region alone, and thus required much less events to be accounted for.

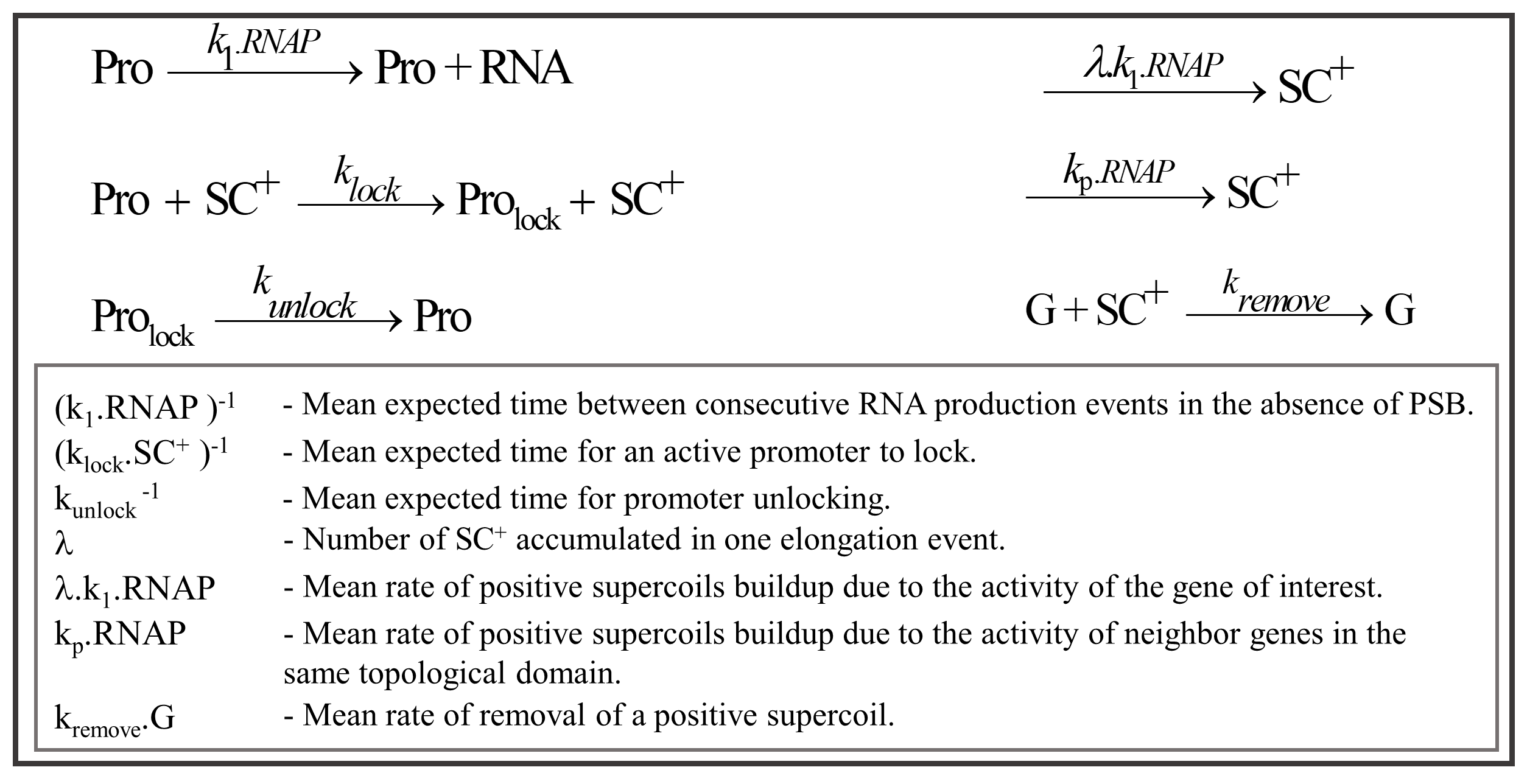
Stochastic, prokaryotic model of the dynamics of RNA production and transcription locking at the promoter region, due to PSB.

Examples of stochastic models that focus on the effects of PSB on a promoter's activity can be found in:. In general, such models include a promoter, Pro, which is the region of DNA controlling transcription and, thus, whose activity/locking is affected by PSB. Also included are RNA molecules (the product of transcription), RNA polymerases (RNAP) which control transcription, and Gyrases (G) which regulate PSB. Finally, there needs to be a means to quantify PSB on the DNA (i.e. the promoter) at any given moment. This can be done by having some component in the system that is produced over time (e.g., during transcription events) to represent positive supercoils, and that is removed by the action of Gyrases. The amount of this component can then be set to affect the rate of transcription.

== Effects on sedimentation coefficient ==
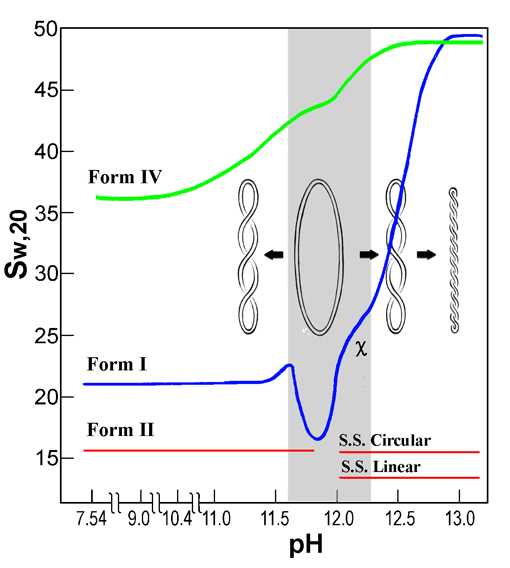
Figure showing the various conformational changes which are observed in circular DNA at different pH. At a pH of about 12 (alkaline), there is a dip in the sedimentation coefficient, followed by a relentless increase up to a pH of about 13, at which pH the structure converts into the mysterious "Form IV".

The topological properties of circular DNA are complex. In standard texts, these properties are invariably explained in terms of a helical model for DNA, but in 2008 it was noted that each topoisomer, negative or positive, adopts a unique and surprisingly wide distribution of three-dimensional conformations.

When the sedimentation coefficient, s, of circular DNA is ascertained over a large range of pH, the following curves are seen. Three curves are shown here, representing three species of DNA. From top-to-bottom they are: "Form IV" (green), "Form I" (blue) and "Form II" (red).

"Form I" (blue curve) is the traditional nomenclature used for the native form of duplex circular DNA, as recovered from viruses and intracellular plasmids. Form I is covalently closed, and any plectonemic winding which may be present is therefore locked in. If one or more nicks are introduced to Form I, free rotation of one strand with respect to the other becomes possible, and Form II (red curve) is seen.

Form IV (green curve) is the product of alkali denaturation of Form I. Its structure is unknown, except that it is persistently duplex, and extremely dense.

Between pH 7 and pH 11.5, the sedimentation coefficient s, for Form I, is constant. Then it dips, and at a pH just below 12, reaches a minimum. With further increases in pH, s then returns to its former value. It doesn't stop there, however, but continues to increase relentlessly. By pH 13, the value of s has risen to nearly 50, two to three times its value at pH 7, indicating an extremely compact structure.

If the pH is then lowered, the s value is not restored. Instead, one sees the upper, green curve. The DNA, now in the state known as Form IV, remains extremely dense, even if the pH is restored to the original physiologic range. As stated previously, the structure of Form IV is almost entirely unknown, and there is no currently accepted explanation for its extraordinary density. About all that is known about the tertiary structure is that it is duplex, but has no hydrogen bonding between bases.

These behaviors of Forms I and IV are considered to be due to the peculiar properties of duplex DNA which has been covalently closed into a double-stranded circle. If the covalent integrity is disrupted by even a single nick in one of the strands, all such topological behavior ceases, and one sees the lower Form II curve (Δ). For Form II, alterations in pH have very little effect on s. Its physical properties are, in general, identical to those of linear DNA. At pH 13, the strands of Form II simply separate, just as the strands of linear DNA do. The separated single strands have slightly different s values, but display no significant changes in s with further increases in pH.

A complete explanation for these data is beyond the scope of this article. In brief, the alterations in s come about because of changes in the superhelicity of circular DNA. These changes in superhelicity are schematically illustrated by four little drawings which have been strategically superimposed upon the figure above.

Briefly, the alterations of s seen in the pH titration curve above are widely thought to be due to changes in the superhelical winding of DNA under conditions of increasing pH. Up to pH 11.5, the purported "underwinding" produces a right-handed ("negative") supertwist. But as the pH increases, and the secondary helical structure begins to denature and unwind, the chromosome (if we may speak anthropomorphically) no longer "wants" to have the full Watson–Crick winding, but rather "wants", increasingly, to be "underwound". Since there is less and less strain to be relieved by superhelical winding, the superhelices therefore progressively disappear as the pH increases. At a pH just below 12, all incentive for superhelicity has expired, and the chromosome will appear as a relaxed, open circle.

At higher pH still, the chromosome, which is now denaturing in earnest, tends to unwind entirely, which it cannot do so (because L_{k} is covalently locked in). Under these conditions, what was once treated as "underwinding" has actually now become "overwinding". Once again there is strain, and once again it is (in part at least) relieved by superhelicity, but this time in the opposite direction (i.e., left-handed or "positive"). Each left-handed tertiary supertwist removes a single, now undesirable right-handed Watson–Crick secondary twist.

The titration ends at pH 13, where Form IV appears.

== See also ==
- Mechanical properties of DNA
- Ribbon theory
