= Topological fluid dynamics =

Topological ideas are relevant to fluid dynamics (including magnetohydrodynamics) at the kinematic level, since any fluid flow involves continuous deformation of any transported scalar or vector field. Problems of stirring and mixing are particularly susceptible to topological techniques. Thus, for example, the Thurston–Nielsen classification has been fruitfully applied to the problem of stirring in two-dimensions by any number of stirrers following a time-periodic 'stirring protocol' (Boyland, Aref & Stremler 2000). Other studies are concerned with flows having chaotic particle paths, and associated exponential rates of mixing (Ottino 1989).

At the dynamic level, the fact that vortex lines are transported by any flow governed by the classical Euler equations implies conservation of any vortical structure within the flow. Such structures are characterised at least in part by the helicity of certain sub-regions of the flow field, a topological invariant of the equations. Helicity plays a central role in dynamo theory, the theory of spontaneous generation of magnetic fields in stars and planets (Moffatt 1978, Parker 1979, Krause & Rädler 1980). It is known that, with few exceptions, any statistically homogeneous turbulent flow having nonzero mean helicity in a sufficiently large expanse of conducting fluid will generate a large-scale magnetic field through dynamo action. Such fields themselves exhibit magnetic helicity, reflecting their own topologically nontrivial structure.

Much interest attaches to the determination of states of minimum energy, subject to prescribed topology. Many problems of fluid dynamics and magnetohydrodynamics fall within this category. Recent developments in topological fluid dynamics include also applications to magnetic braids in the solar corona, DNA knotting by topoisomerases, polymer entanglement in chemical physics and chaotic behavior in dynamical systems. A mathematical introduction to this subject is given by Arnold & Khesin (1998) and recent survey articles and contributions may be found in Ricca (2009), and Moffatt, Bajer & Kimura (2013).

Topology is also crucial to the structure of neutral surfaces in a fluid (such as the ocean) where the equation of state nonlinearly depends on multiple components (e.g. salinity and heat). Fluid parcels remain neutrally buoyant as they move along neutral surfaces, despite variations in salinity or heat. On such surfaces, the salinity and heat are functionally related, but this function is multivalued. The spatial regions within which this function becomes single-valued are those where there is at most one contour of salinity (or heat) per isovalue, which are precisely the regions associated with each edge of the Reeb graph of the salinity (or heat) on the surface (Stanley 2019).
