= Linking number =

How many times curves wind around each other

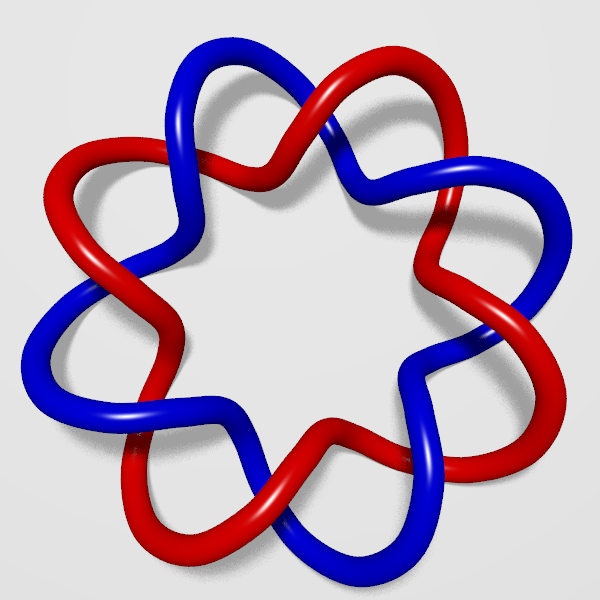
The two curves of this (2, 8)-torus link have linking number four.

In mathematics, the linking number is a numerical invariant that describes the linking of two closed curves in three-dimensional space. Intuitively, the linking number represents the number of times that each curve winds around the other. In Euclidean space, the linking number is always an integer, but may be positive or negative depending on the orientation of the two curves (this is not true for curves in most 3-manifolds, where linking numbers can also be fractions or just not exist at all).

The linking number was introduced by Gauss in the form of the linking integral. It is an important object of study in knot theory, algebraic topology, and differential geometry, and has numerous applications in mathematics and science, including quantum mechanics, electromagnetism, and the study of DNA supercoiling.

== Definition ==
Any two closed curves in space, if allowed to pass through themselves but not each other, can be moved into exactly one of the following standard positions. This determines the linking number:

⋯
	linking number −2	linking number −1	linking number 0
					⋯
		linking number 1	linking number 2	linking number 3

Each curve may pass through itself during this motion, but the two curves must remain separated throughout. This is formalized as regular homotopy, which further requires that each curve be an immersion, not just any map. However, this added condition does not change the definition of linking number (it does not matter if the curves are required to always be immersions or not), which is an example of an h-principle (homotopy-principle), meaning that geometry reduces to topology.

=== Proof ===
This fact (that the linking number is the only invariant) is most easily proven by placing one circle in standard position, and then showing that linking number is the only invariant of the other circle. In detail:

- A single curve is regular homotopic to a standard circle (any knot can be unknotted if the curve is allowed to pass through itself). The fact that it is homotopic is clear, since 3-space is contractible and thus all maps into it are homotopic, though the fact that this can be done through immersions requires some geometric argument.
- The complement of a standard circle is homeomorphic to a solid torus with a point removed (this can be seen by interpreting 3-space as the 3-sphere with the point at infinity removed, and the 3-sphere as two solid tori glued along the boundary), or the complement can be analyzed directly.
- The fundamental group of 3-space minus a circle is the integers, corresponding to linking number. This can be seen via the Seifert–Van Kampen theorem (either adding the point at infinity to get a solid torus, or adding the circle to get 3-space, allows one to compute the fundamental group of the desired space).
- Thus homotopy classes of a curve in 3-space minus a circle are determined by linking number.
- It is also true that regular homotopy classes are determined by linking number, which requires additional geometric argument.

== Computing the linking number ==
With six positive crossings and two negative crossings, these curves have linking number two.

There is an algorithm to compute the linking number of two curves from a link diagram. Label each crossing as positive or negative, according to the following rule:

The total number of positive crossings minus the total number of negative crossings is equal to twice the linking number. That is:

$$\text{linking number}=\frac{n_1 + n_2 - n_3 - n_4}{2}$$

where n_{1}, n_{2}, n_{3}, n_{4} represent the number of crossings of each of the four types. The two sums $n_1 + n_3\,\!$ and $n_2 + n_4\,\!$ are always equal, which leads to the following alternative formula

$$\text{linking number} \,=\, n_1 - n_4 \,=\, n_2 - n_3.$$

The formula $n_1-n_4$ involves only the undercrossings of the blue curve by the red, while $n_2-n_3$ involves only the overcrossings.

== Properties and examples ==
The two curves of the Whitehead link have linking number zero.

- Any two unlinked curves have linking number zero. However, two curves with linking number zero may still be linked (e.g. the Whitehead link).
- Reversing the orientation of either of the curves negates the linking number, while reversing the orientation of both curves leaves it unchanged.
- The linking number is chiral: taking the mirror image of link negates the linking number. The convention for positive linking number is based on a right-hand rule.
- The winding number of an oriented curve in the x-y plane is equal to its linking number with the z-axis (thinking of the z-axis as a closed curve in the 3-sphere).
- More generally, if either of the curves is simple, then the first homology group of its complement is isomorphic to Z. In this case, the linking number is determined by the homology class of the other curve.
- In physics, the linking number is an example of a topological quantum number.

== Gauss's integral definition ==
Given two non-intersecting differentiable curves $\gamma_1, \gamma_2 \colon S^1 \rightarrow \mathbb{R}^3$, define the Gauss map $\Gamma$ from the torus to the sphere by

$$\Gamma(s,t) = \frac{\gamma_1(s) - \gamma_2(t)}{|\gamma_1(s) - \gamma_2(t)|}$$

Pick a point in the unit sphere, v, so that orthogonal projection of the link to the plane perpendicular to v gives a link diagram. Observe that a point (s, t) that goes to v under the Gauss map corresponds to a crossing in the link diagram where $\gamma_1$ is over $\gamma_2$. Also, a neighborhood of (s, t) is mapped under the Gauss map to a neighborhood of v preserving or reversing orientation depending on the sign of the crossing. Thus in order to compute the linking number of the diagram corresponding to v it suffices to count the signed number of times the Gauss map covers v. Since v is a regular value, this is precisely the degree of the Gauss map (i.e. the signed number of times that the image of Γ covers the sphere). Isotopy invariance of the linking number is automatically obtained as the degree is invariant under homotopic maps. Any other regular value would give the same number, so the linking number doesn't depend on any particular link diagram.

This formulation of the linking number of γ_{1} and γ_{2} enables an explicit formula as a double line integral, the Gauss linking integral:

$$\begin{align}
\operatorname{link}(\gamma_1,\gamma_2)
&= \frac{1}{4\pi} \oint_{\gamma_1} \oint_{\gamma_2} \frac{\mathbf{r}_1 - \mathbf{r}_2}{|\mathbf{r}_1 - \mathbf{r}_2|^3} \cdot (d\mathbf{r}_1 \times d\mathbf{r}_2) \\[4pt]
&= \frac{1}{4\pi} \int_{S^1 \times S^1} \frac{\det\left(\dot\gamma_1(s), \dot\gamma_2(t), \gamma_1(s) - \gamma_2(t)\right)}{\left|\gamma_1(s) - \gamma_2(t)\right|^3}\, ds\, dt
\end{align}$$

This integral computes the total signed area of the image of the Gauss map (the integrand being the Jacobian of Γ) and then divides by the area of the sphere (which is 4π). It must be noted that some authors use a different sign convention for the integral.

== In quantum field theory ==
In quantum field theory, Gauss's integral definition arises when computing the expectation value of the Wilson loop observable in $U(1)$ Chern–Simons gauge theory. Explicitly, the abelian Chern–Simons action for a gauge potential one-form $A$ on a three-manifold $M$ is given by

$$S_{CS} = \frac{k}{4\pi} \int_M A \wedge dA$$

We are interested in doing the Feynman path integral for Chern–Simons in $M = \mathbb{R}^3$:

$$Z[\gamma_1, \gamma_2] = \int \mathcal{D} A_\mu \exp \left( \frac{ik}{4\pi} \int d^3 x \varepsilon^{\lambda \mu \nu} A_\lambda \partial_\mu A_\nu + i \int_{\gamma_1} dx^\mu \, A_\mu + i \int_{\gamma_2} dx^\mu \, A_\mu \right)$$

Here, $\epsilon$ is the antisymmetric symbol. Since the theory is just Gaussian, no ultraviolet regularization or renormalization is needed. Therefore, the topological invariance of right hand side ensures that the result of the path integral will be a topological invariant. The only thing left to do is provide an overall normalization factor, and a natural choice will present itself. Since the theory is Gaussian and abelian, the path integral can be done simply by solving the theory classically and substituting for $A$.

The classical equations of motion are

$$\varepsilon^{\lambda \mu \nu} \partial_\mu A_\nu = \frac{2\pi}{k} J^\lambda$$

Here, we have coupled the Chern–Simons field to a source with a term $-J_\mu A^\mu$ in the Lagrangian. Obviously, by substituting the appropriate $J$, we can get back the Wilson loops. Since we are in 3 dimensions, we can rewrite the equations of motion in a more familiar notation:

$$\vec{\nabla} \times \vec{A} = \frac{2\pi}{k} \vec{J}$$

Taking the curl of both sides and choosing Lorenz gauge $\partial^\mu A_\mu = 0$, the equations become

$$\nabla^2 \vec{A} = - \frac{2\pi}{k} \vec{\nabla} \times \vec{J}$$

From electrostatics, the solution is

$$A_\lambda(\vec{x}) = \frac{1}{2k} \int d^3 \vec{y} \, \frac{\varepsilon_{\lambda \mu \nu} \partial^\mu J^\nu (\vec{y})}{|\vec{x} - \vec{y}|}$$

The path integral for arbitrary $J$ is now easily done by substituting this into the Chern–Simons action to get an effective action for the $J$ field. To get the path integral for the Wilson loops, we substitute for a source describing two particles moving in closed loops, i.e. $J = J_1 + J_2$, with

$$J_i^\mu (x) = \int_{\gamma_i} dx_i^\mu \delta^3 (x - x_i (t))$$

Since the effective action is quadratic in $J$, it is clear that there will be terms describing the self-interaction of the particles, and these are uninteresting since they would be there even in the presence of just one loop. Therefore, we normalize the path integral by a factor precisely cancelling these terms. Going through the algebra, we obtain

$$Z[\gamma_1, \gamma_2] = \exp{ \left( \frac{2\pi i}{k} \Phi[\gamma_1, \gamma_2] \right) },$$

where

$$\Phi[\gamma_1, \gamma_2] = \frac{1}{4\pi} \int_{\gamma_1} dx^\lambda \int_{\gamma_2} dy^\mu \, \frac{(x - y)^\nu}{|x - y|^3} \varepsilon_{\lambda \mu \nu},$$

which is simply Gauss's linking integral. This is the simplest example of a topological quantum field theory, where the path integral computes topological invariants. This also served as a hint that the nonabelian variant of Chern–Simons theory computes other knot invariants, and it was shown explicitly by Edward Witten that the nonabelian theory gives the invariant known as the Jones polynomial.

The Chern-Simons gauge theory lives in 3 spacetime dimensions. More generally, there exists higher dimensional topological quantum field theories. There exists more complicated multi-loop/string-braiding statistics of 4-dimensional gauge theories captured by the link invariants of exotic topological quantum field theories in 4 spacetime dimensions.

== Generalizations ==
The Milnor invariants generalize linking number to links with three or more components, allowing one to prove that the Borromean rings are linked, though any two components have linking number 0.

- Just as closed curves can be linked in three dimensions, any two closed manifolds of dimensions m and n may be linked in a Euclidean space of dimension $m + n + 1$. Any such link has an associated Gauss map, whose degree is a generalization of the linking number.
- Any framed knot has a self-linking number obtained by computing the linking number of the knot C with a new curve obtained by slightly moving the points of C along the framing vectors. The self-linking number obtained by moving vertically (along the blackboard framing) is known as Kauffman's self-linking number.
- The linking number is defined for two linked circles; given three or more circles, one can define the Milnor invariants, which are a numerical invariant generalizing linking number.
- In algebraic topology, the cup product is a far-reaching algebraic generalization of the linking number, with the Massey products being the algebraic analogs for the Milnor invariants.
- A linkless embedding of an undirected graph is an embedding into three-dimensional space such that every two cycles have zero linking number. The graphs that have a linkless embedding have a forbidden minor characterization as the graphs with no Petersen family minor.

== See also ==
- Differentiable curve – Study of curves from a differential point of view
- Hopf invariant – Homotopy invariant of maps between n-spheres
- Kissing number – Geometric concept
- Writhe – Invariant of a knot diagram
