= Vertex =

Vertex, vertices or vertexes may refer to:

== Science and technology ==
=== Mathematics and computer science ===
- Vertex (geometry), a point where two or more curves, lines, or edges meet
- Vertex (computer graphics), a data structure that describes the position of a point
- Vertex (curve), a point of a plane curve where the first derivative of curvature is zero
- Vertex (graph theory), the fundamental unit of which graphs are formed
- Vertex (topography), in a triangulated irregular network
- Vertex of a representation, in finite group theory

=== Physics ===
- Vertex (physics), the reconstructed location of an individual particle collision
- Vertex (optics), a point where the optical axis crosses an optical surface
- Vertex function, describing the interaction between a photon and an electron

=== Biology and anatomy ===
- Vertex (anatomy), the highest point of the head
- Vertex (gastropod): the highest physical point of the shell
- Vertex (urinary bladder), alternative name of the apex of urinary bladder
- Vertex distance, the distance between the surface of the cornea of the eye and a lens situated in front of it
- Vertex presentation, a head-first presentation at childbirth

== Businesses ==
- Vertex (company), an American business services provider
- Vertex Holdings, an investment holding company in Singapore
- Vertex Inc, an American tax compliance software and services company
- Vertex Pharmaceuticals, an American biotech company
- Vertex Railcar, a Chinese-American manufacturer of railroad rolling stock 2014–2018
- Vertex Resource Group, a Canadian environmental services company

== Other uses ==
- Vertex (album), by Buck 65, 1997
- Vertex (band), formed in 1996
- Vertex (astrology), the point where the prime vertical intersects the ecliptic

== See also ==
- Virtex (disambiguation)
- Vortex (disambiguation)
- Vertex model, a type of statistical mechanics model
- Vertex operator algebra in conformal field theory
