= Power spot (spirituality) =

Special places of Japanese new religions

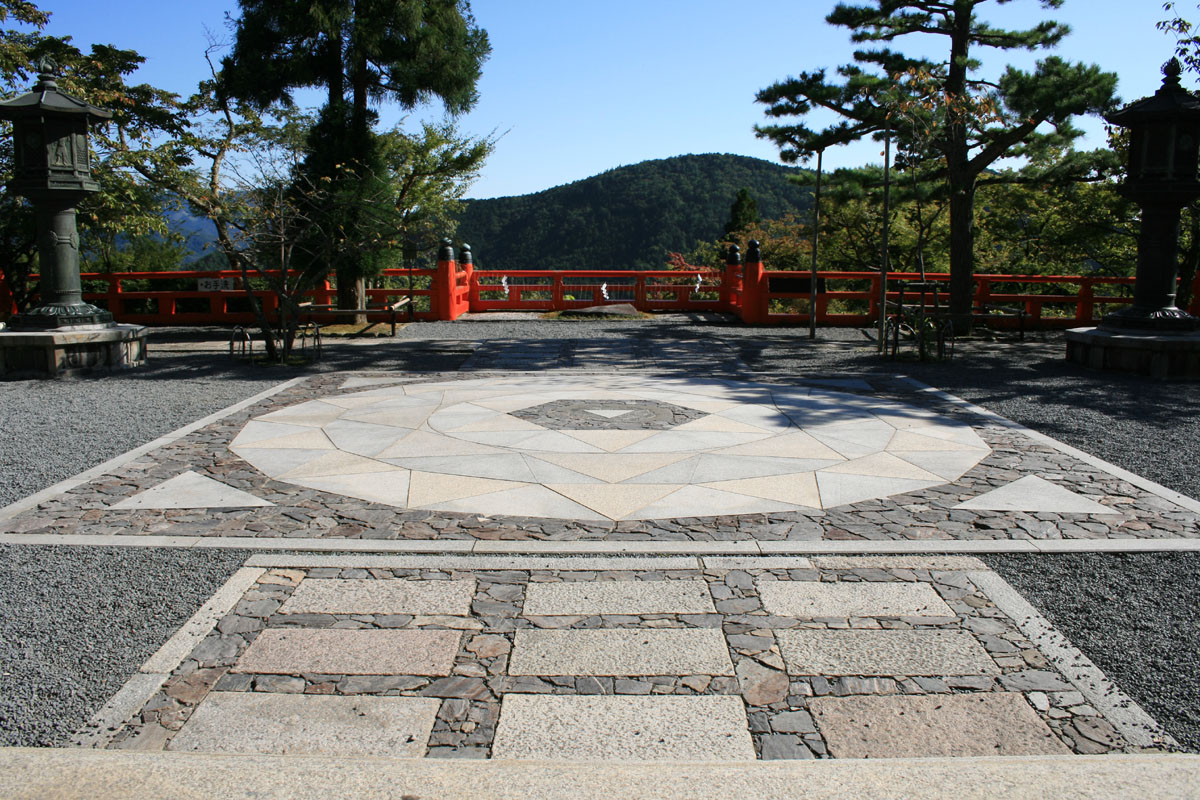
Power spot of Kurama-dera

Power Spots (パワースポット), are special places scattered around the earth in some Japanese new religious movements. They are also called "energy spots" or Qi fields. The phrase is an example of a wasei-eigo loanword.

In the book Power Spots of the World: A Travel Guide to Healing and Self-Recovery, it is explained that power spots may have water that is said to heal, rocks that are said to speak to people, or fault lines that emit magnetic forces.

In new age thought in Europe and the United States, a "spiritual vortex" is a place where vortices erupt with energy from the earth. Sedona, Arizona is a famous example.

Hiroshi Aramata claims that "a power spot can be thought of as a place where the power of the earth (qi) is felt." He points out that although the term power spot is new, there have been attempts to obtain the power of the earth for a long time. Aramata suggests that in Japan, the Kumano Sanzan Pilgrimage is a very old example. Aramata believes that the pilgrimage to Kumano Sanzan was an epoch-making event because it was possible for people of any status or gender to gain power by simply paying a visit to a certain place, something that could normally only be obtained through Shugendō. Similarly, the Okagemaeri (ja:お蔭参り) to Ise Grand Shrine was advertised as a way for people of all genders to obtain power that only Shugenja could obtain.

According to All About, many places that have come to be called "power spots" or "spiritual spots" were originally places of faith and nature worship. Such places were traditionally called holy places (霊場, reijo) or sacred places (聖地, seichi).

== History ==
In historical nature worship, in addition to wind, thunder, clouds, etc., mountains, earth, rivers, and lakes are also objects of worship. This is especially true of earthly places, especially among agricultural peoples. Mountains are considered sacred places and are often regarded as the home of divine spirits and the land of the dead. In Japan, mountains with beautiful shapes such as Mount Fuji, Mount Hiko, and Mount Haku, mountains that are believed to bring rain, and mountains with unique shapes, hot springs, or ponds, have been worshiped since ancient times and are still worshiped today (see: mountain worship). Rivers and lakes are considered sacred, especially by North American Indian tribes, and there are many legends and myths about them as places where water spirits and water gods live.

In Japan, after 1975, Masuaki Kiyota, who claimed to be a psychic, used the term "power spot" to mean a place to take in the energy of the earth, and the term spread in the early 1990s.

In the 2000s, public interest in feng shui and new spiritualism increased. There was also a boom in junrei to places such as shrines and temples. Hiroyuki Ehara, chairman of the Japan Spiritualism Association, began calling shrines and temples "spiritual sanctuaries" (スピリチュアル・サンクチュアリ).

In August 2010, Yoimuri Shimbun reported, "Shrines and Mountains called 'power spots' are gaining popularity throughout Japan as places where special powers can be obtained". On September 23, 2010, NHK Hi-Vision broadcast the program "Kumamoto Wind, Earth and Sky Mystery: Kumamoto Power Spot Grand Tour".

== Japanese power spots ==
- Mount Fuji
- Mount Miwa
- Mount Ontake
- Mount Hakone
- Ise Grand Shrine
- Kamado Shrine
- Chikubu Island
- Lake Biwa
- Mount Takao
- Suwa Shrine
- Kurama-dera

== Overseas power spots ==
Sedona, Arizona is said to have power flow out of the earth in vortices across several landforms, according to new age spiritualist Page Bryant, and is considered a sacred place for spiritualists and tourists attraction. Hiroshi Aramata considers some overseas locations to be power spots, including the Guiana Highlands and the Chocolate Hills of Bohol Island in the Philippines.

== In popular culture ==
- In the Pokémon media franchise, Stonjourner, a rock Pokémon intended to resemble Stonehenge and introduced in Sword and Shield, has a special ability called "Power Spot".
- A power spot is a plot device in Tokusatsu series Magic Bullet Chronicles Ryukendo.

== See also ==
- Spiritual vortex (a.k.a. energy vortex)
  - Bell Rock (Arizona)
  - Mount Shasta
  - Machu Picchu
  - Stonehenge
  - Uluru
  - Mount Paektu - North Korea
  - Hallasan - Kármán vortex street
  - Mount Fuji
- Ley line
  - Dragon vein
- Mountain worship
- New religious movement
- Japanese new religions
- Junrei
- Qi
- Feng shui
