= VTX =

VTX may refer to:

- Honda VTX Series, a line of V-twin Honda cruiser motorcycles
- Vertex Resource Group (TSX-V symbol: VTX), a publicly traded environmental services company
- VTX, a cost-reduced version of the RealityEngine 3D graphics hardware architecture
- VTX, a graphics subsystem of the SGI Onyx series of visualization systems
- x86 virtualization (also VT-x), the use of hardware-assisted virtualization capabilities on an x86/x86-64 CPU
