= Gunsan Oreum =

Mountain in Jeju Province, South Korea

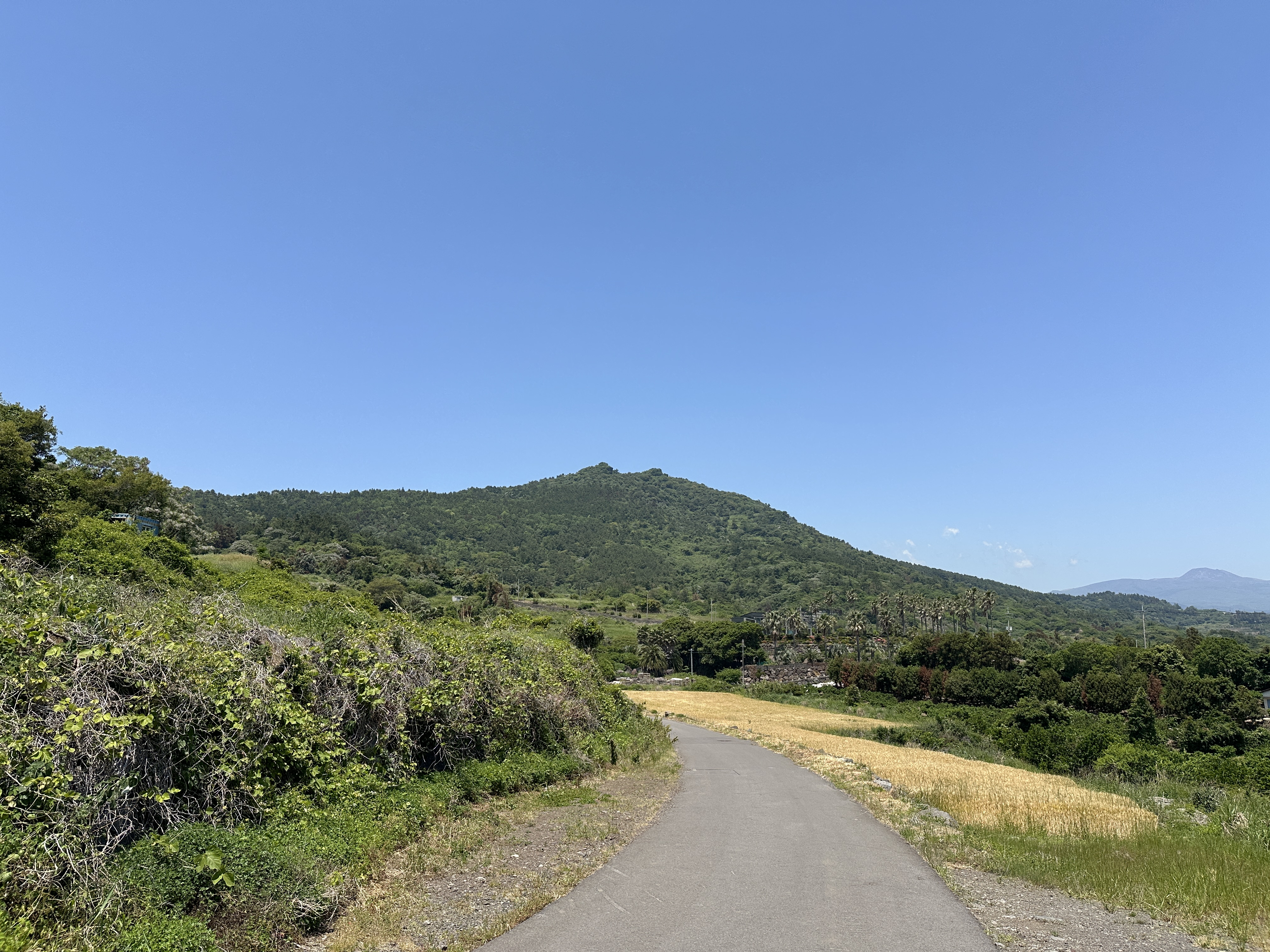
- View from the south (2026)

Highest point
- Coordinates: 33.2530°N 126.3702°E

Geography

Korean name
- Hangul: 군산오름
- Hanja: 軍山오름
- RR: Gunsanoreum
- MR: Kunsanorŭm

Gunsan Oreum (Korean: 군산오름) or Gunsan is an oreum (small extinct volcano) in Andeok-myeon, Seogwipo, Jeju Province, South Korea.

The mountain's name (which means "soldier mountain") reportedly comes from the fact that it looks like a tent pitched by a soldier.

The mountain has a height of 334.5m and a circumference of 8,111m. It is among the largest and oldest on Jeju; it is believed to have first erupted around 917,000 years ago.

The mountain is popular for hiking and is open year-round. There are curated hiking paths up the mountain, as well as a paved road suitable for cars. The paved road goes almost to the summit of the mountain; from the parking lot is a brief hike to the summit of the mountain. The view at the top is considered to be scenic, with panoramic views of the island's main mountain Hallasan, the ocean, and the mountain Sanbangsan.

== Gallery ==
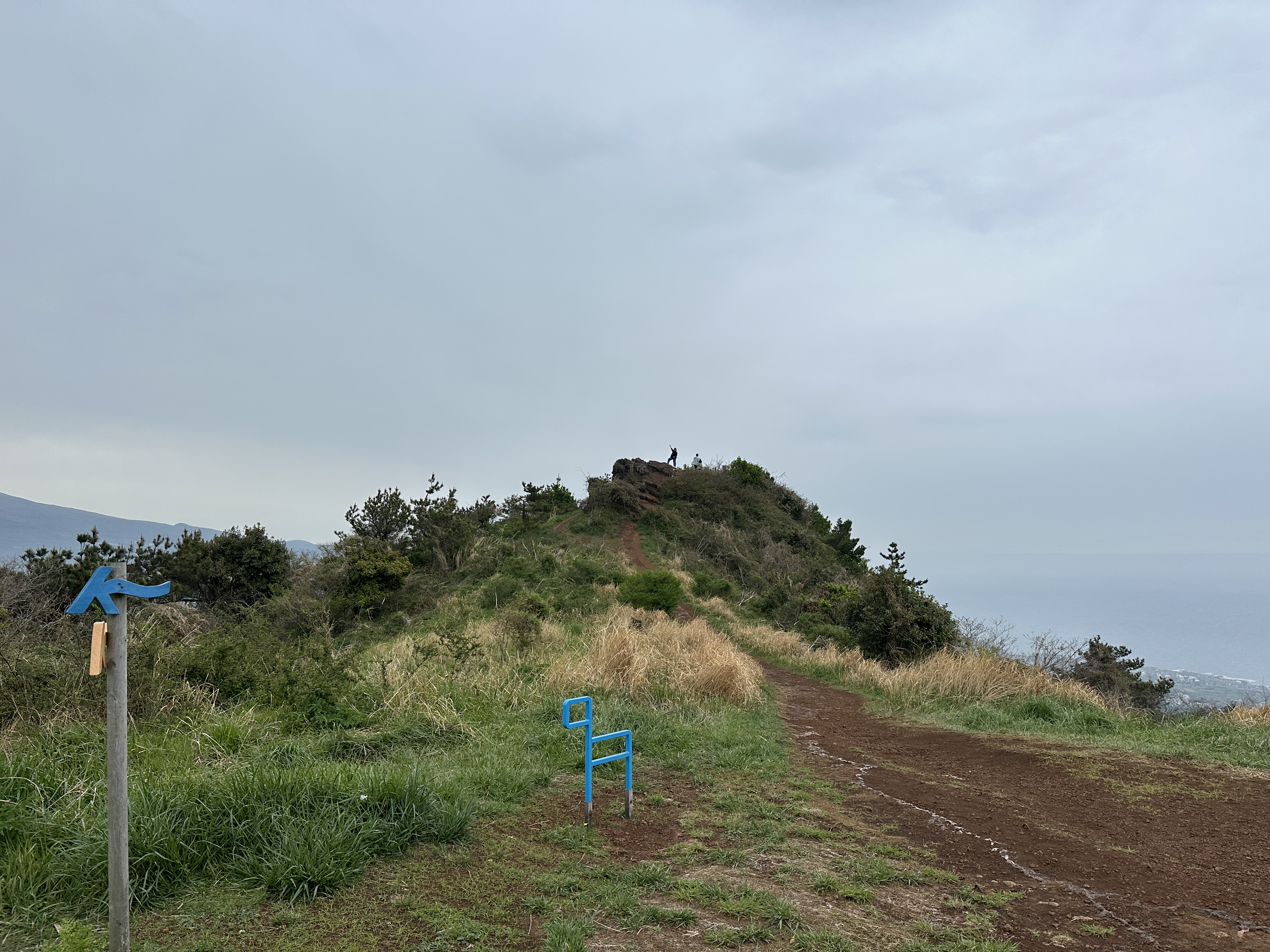
Summit of the mountain (2026)

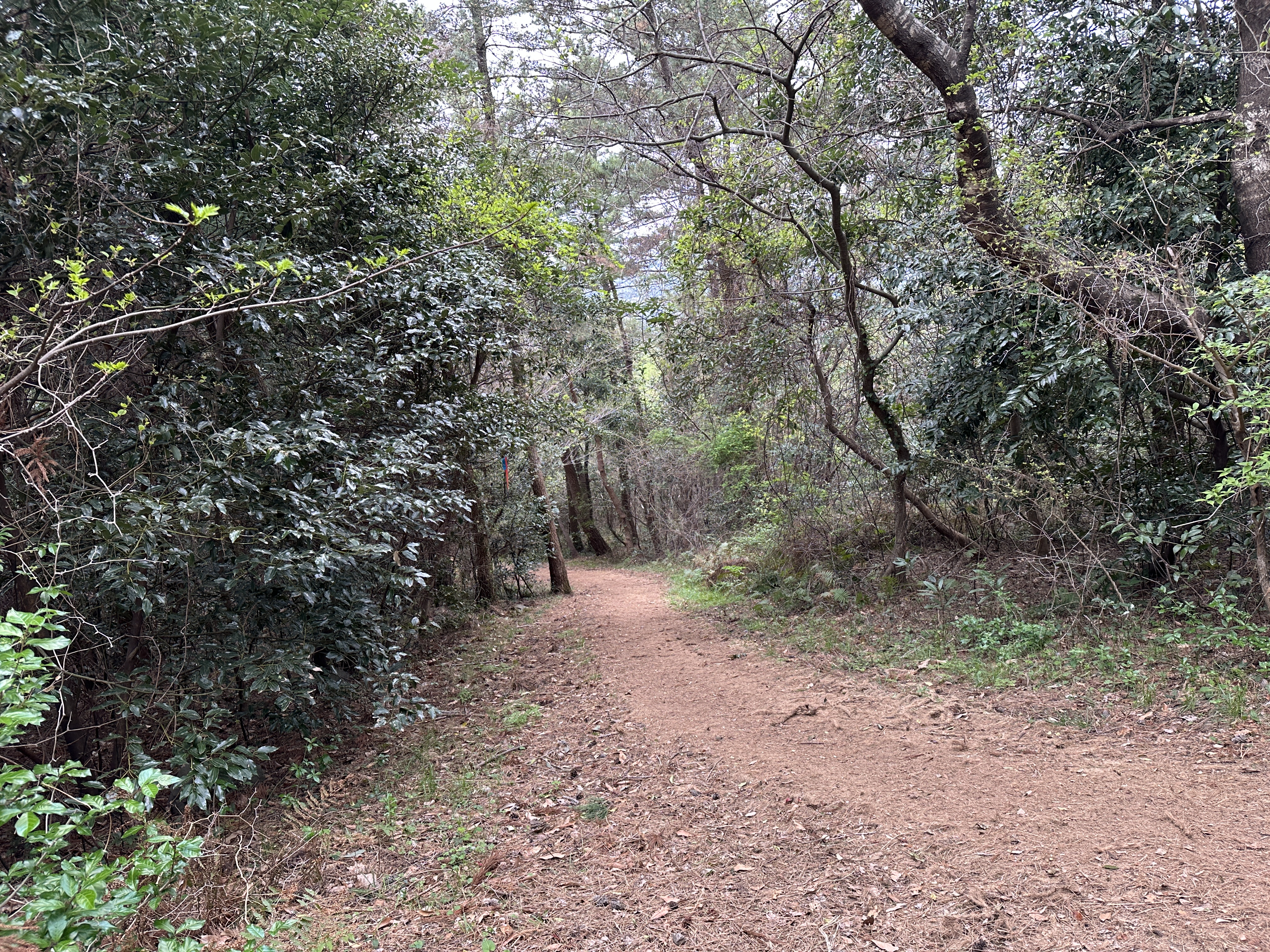
Trail on the mountain (2026)

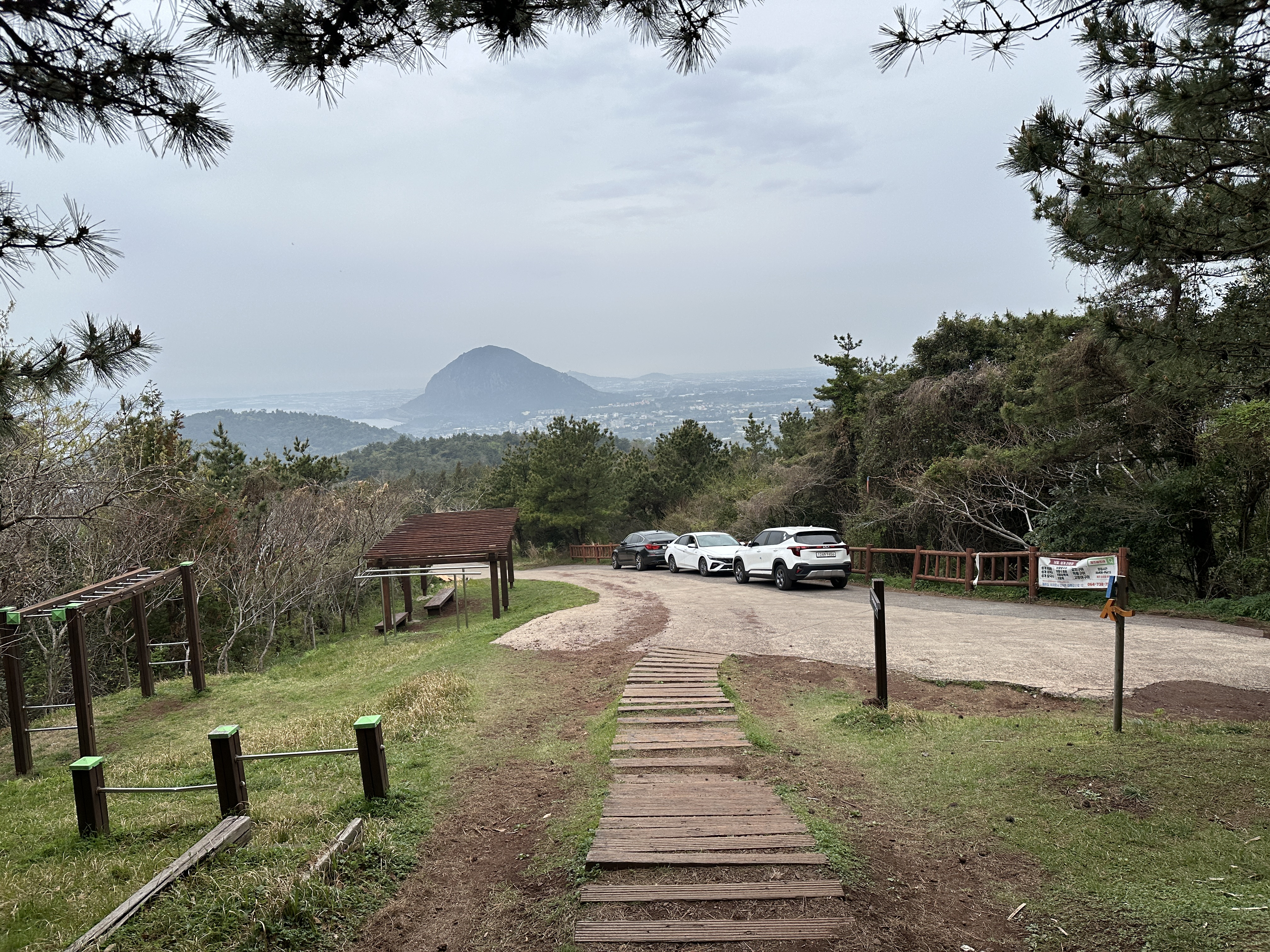
Parking lot and paved road at the top of the mountain (2026)

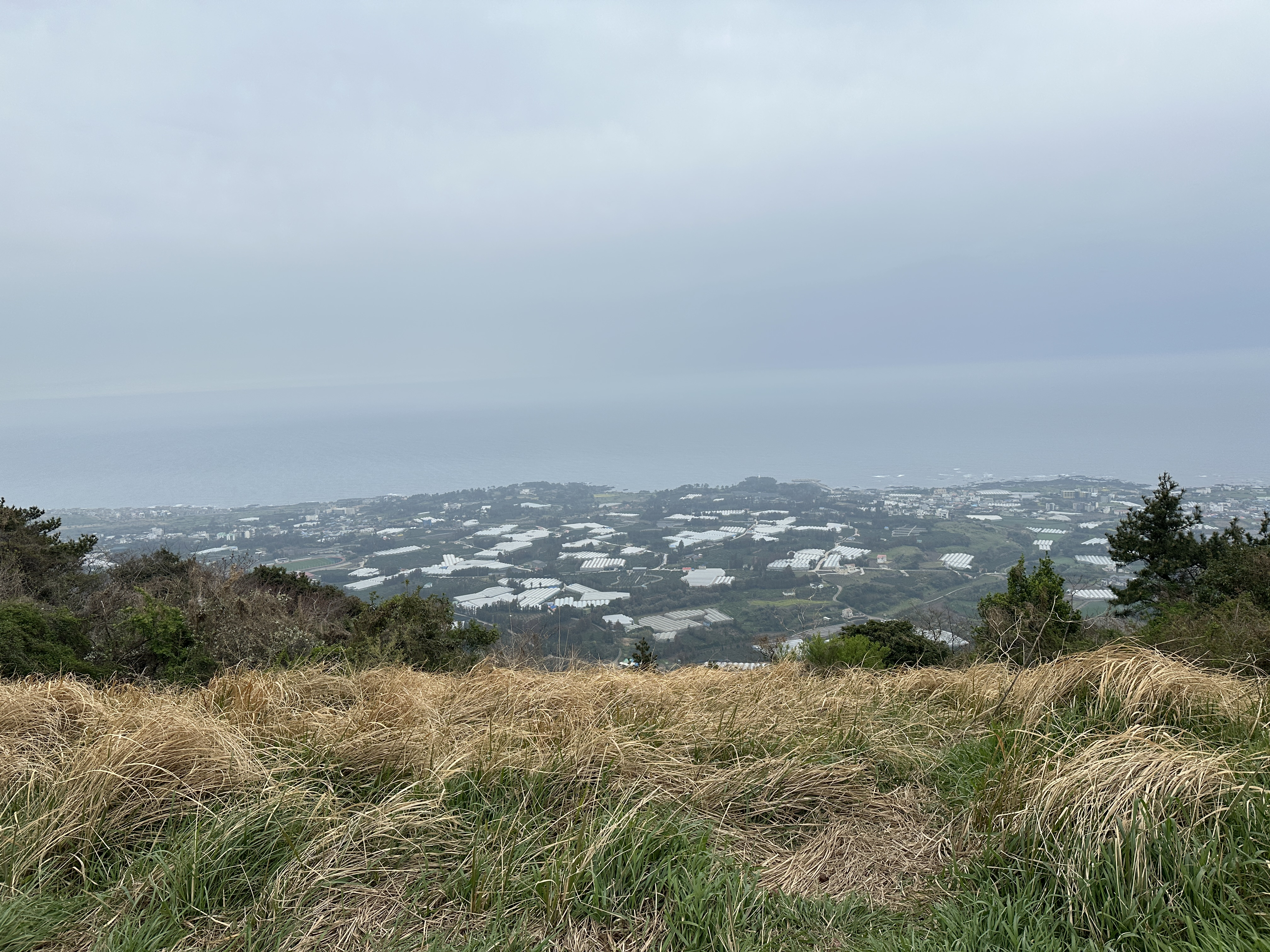
View of the ocean from the summit (2026)
