= Kiyota =

Kiyota (written: 清田) is a Japanese surname. Notable people with the surname include:

- Ikuhiro Kiyota (清田 育宏, born 1986), Japanese baseball player
- Mao Kiyota (清田 真央, born 1993), Japanese long-distance runner
- Masuaki Kiyota (清田 益章, born 1962), Japanese psychic

== See also ==
- Kiyota-ku, Sapporo, a ward of Sapporo, Hokkaido, Japan
