= Virtex =

- Virtex (FPGA), a series of FPGAs produced by Xilinx
- Virtex, a series of comic books published by Oktomica Comics
- Virtex L, otherwise known as sodium dithionite

== See also ==
- Vertex (disambiguation)
