= Thoughtography =

Claimed psychic ability

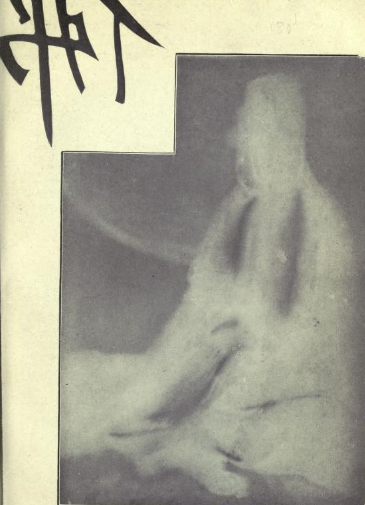
An alleged "thought photograph" obtained by Tomokichi Fukurai.

Thoughtography, also called projected thermography, psychic photography, nengraphy and nensha (Japanese: 念写), is the claimed ability to "burn" images from one's mind onto surfaces such as photographic film by parapsychic means. While the term "thoughtography" has been in the English lexicon since 1913, the more recent term "projected thermography" is a neologism popularized in the 2002 American film The Ring, a remake of the 1998 Japanese horror film Ring.

== History ==
Thoughtography (also known as psychic photography) first emerged in the late 19th century due to the influence of spirit photography. Thoughtography has no connection with Spiritualism, which distinguishes it from spirit photography. One of the first books to mention "psychic photography" was the book The New Photography (1896) by Arthur Brunel Chatwood. In the book Chatwood described experiments where the "image of objects on the retina of the human eye might so affect it that a photograph could be produced by looking at a sensitive plate." The book was criticized in a review in Nature.

The psychical researcher Hereward Carrington, in his book Modern Psychical Phenomena (1919), wrote that many psychic photographs were revealed to be fraudulent produced by substitution and manipulation of the plates, double-printing, double-exposure and chemical screens. However, Carrington also stated he believed some of the photographs to be genuine. The term "thoughtography" was first introduced at the beginning of the twentieth century by Tomokichi Fukurai.

Skeptics, among them professional photographers, consider psychic photographs to be faked or the result of flaws in the camera or film, exposures, film-processing errors, lens flares, flash reflections or chemical reactions.

== Claims ==
=== Tomokichi Fukurai ===
Around 1910, during a period of interest in Spiritualism in Japan, Tomokichi Fukurai, an assistant professor of psychology at Tokyo University, began pursuing parapsychology experiments using Chizuko Mifune, Ikuko Nagao, and others as subjects. Fukurai published results of experiments with Nagao that alleged she was capable of telepathically imprinting images on photo plates, which he called nensha. When journalists found irregularities, Nagao's credibility was attacked, and there was speculation that her later illness and death was caused by distress over criticism. In 1913, Fukurai published Clairvoyance and Thoughtography. The book was criticized for a lack of scientific approach and his work disparaged by the university and his colleagues. Fukurai eventually resigned in 1913.

=== Eva Carrière ===
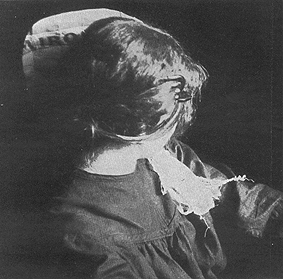
Carrière with fake ectoplasm made from the French magazine Le Miroir.

In the early 20th century the psychical researcher Albert von Schrenck-Notzing investigated the medium Eva Carrière and claimed her ectoplasm "materializations" were the result of "ideoplasty" with which the medium could form images onto ectoplasm from her mind. Schrenck-Notzing published the book Phenomena of Materialisation (1923) which included photographs of the ectoplasm. Critics pointed out the photographs of the ectoplasm revealed marks of magazine cut-outs, pins and a piece of string. Schrenck-Notzing admitted that on several occasions Carrière deceptively smuggled pins into the séance room. The magician Carlos María de Heredia replicated the ectoplasm of Carrière using a comb, gauze and a handkerchief.

Donald West wrote that the ectoplasm of Carrière was fake and was made of cut-out paper faces from newspapers and magazines on which fold marks could sometimes be seen in the photographs. A photograph of Carrière taken from the back of the ectoplasm face revealed it to be made from a magazine cut out with the letters "Le Miro". The two-dimensional face had been clipped from the French magazine Le Miroir. Back issues of the magazine also matched some of Carrière's ectoplasm faces. Cut out faces that she used included Woodrow Wilson, King Ferdinand of Bulgaria, French president Raymond Poincaré and the actress Monna Delza.

After Schrenck-Notzing discovered Carrière had taken her ectoplasm faces from the magazine he defended her by claiming she had read the magazine but her memory had recalled the images and they had materialized into the ectoplasm. Schrenck-Notzing was described as credulous. Joseph McCabe wrote "In Germany and Austria, Baron von Schrenck-Notzing is the laughing-stock of his medical colleagues."

=== Ted Serios ===
In the 1960s, it was claimed that Chicago resident Ted Serios, a hotel bellhop in his late forties, used psychokinetic powers to produce images on Polaroid instant film. Serios's psychic claims were bolstered by the endorsement of a Denver-based psychiatrist, Jule Eisenbud (1908–1999), who wrote a book, The World of Ted Serios: "Thoughtographic" Studies of an Extraordinary Mind (1967), arguing that Serios's purported psychic abilities were genuine. However, professional photographers and skeptics found that Serios was employing simple sleight of hand.

=== Masuaki Kiyota ===
Masuaki Kiyota is a Japanese psychic who was claimed to possess psychokinetic powers. Kiyota was tested by investigators in London by Granada Television and the results were negative. It was discovered that with tight controls, Kiyota was unable to project mental images onto film. He could only achieve success when he had the film in his possession without any control for at least 2 hours.

According to magician and skeptic James Randi "Kiyota's Polaroid photos were apparently produced by preexposing the film, since it was noted that he made great efforts to obtain a film pack and spend time with it in private." In a 1984 television interview, Kiyota confessed to fraud.

=== Uri Geller ===
In 1995, famed psychic Uri Geller began to use a 35 mm camera in his performances. The lens cap left on the camera, Geller would take pictures of his forehead and then have the pictures developed. Geller claimed that subsequent images had come directly from his mind. James Randi claimed Geller had performed the trick by using a "handheld optical device" or by taking photographs on already exposed film.

== See also ==
- Kilner screens
- Kirlian photography
- Optography
