= Jonjaamji =

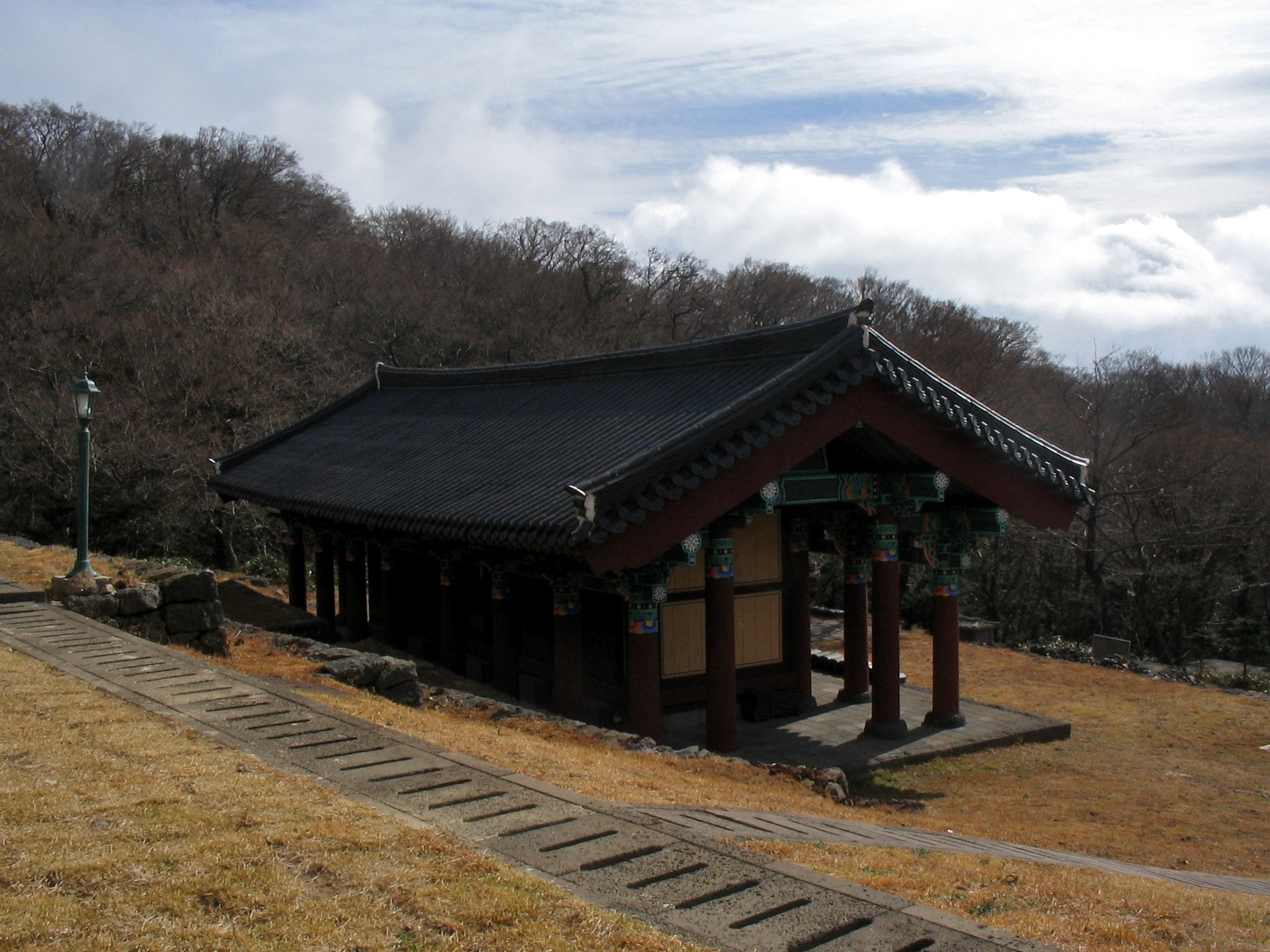
- Jonjaamji in 2007

- Location within South Korea

Religion
- Affiliation: Buddhism

Location
- State: Jeju Island
- Country: South Korea
- Coordinates: 33.3475678°N 126.479800°E

Korean name
- Hangul: 존자암지
- Hanja: 尊者庵址
- RR: Jonjaamji
- MR: Chonjaamji

Jonjaamji is a Korean Buddhist site featuring a pagoda preserving the sacred relics of The Buddha. Jonjaamji is located in a valley on the southwest ridge of Bulrae Oreum at the Yeongsil Track region of Hallasan on Jeju Island, South Korea. On November 1, 2000, the Jeju Provincial Government designated Jonjaamji as Tangible Property Number 17.

== History ==
It is unknown when exactly the Jonjaam temple was founded, but two excavations in 1993 and 1994 suggest that it was constructed by Jonja, the great monk of Arhan, during the late Goryeo dynasty and continuing into the mid-Joseon dynasty period.

Chungam Kim Jeong, who was exiled to Jeju-do in August 1520, wrote a book called "Jonjaam Jungsugi." According to his writings, Jonjaam was created when three families, Go, Yang and Bu (the demi-gods from the Samseonghyeol legend) settled on Jeju-do.

== See also ==
- Korean Buddhist temples
- Korean Buddhism
