= Vortex (disambiguation) =

A vortex is a dynamic phenomenon of fluids.

Vortex may also refer to:

== Physics ==
- Vortex ring, a torus-shaped vortex in a fluid or gas
- Vorticity, a mathematical concept used in fluid dynamics
- Quantum vortex, a topological defect exhibited in superfluids and superconductors
- Autowave vortex, in active media described by parabolic equation with non-linear free member of a special form

== Books ==
- The Vortex, a play by Noël Coward
- The Vortex (novel), a 1924 novel by Colombian author José Eustasio Rivera
- Vortex (Cleary novel), a 1978 novel by Australian author Jon Cleary
- Vortex (Bond and Larkin novel), a 1991 war novel by Larry Bond and Patrick Larkin
- Vortex (Wilson novel), a 2011 science fiction novel by Robert Charles Wilson, the sequel to Axis
- Vortex (Hall novel), a 2024 novel by Australian author Rodney Hall

== Film and TV ==
=== Film ===
- The Vortex (film), a 1927 British film adaptation of the Noël Coward play
- Vortex, the Face of Medusa, a 1967 Greek-British drama
- Vortex (1981 film), an American crime drama
- Vortex (2009 film), a Lithuanian drama
- Vortex (2021 film), French psychological drama
- Vortex, a planet in the Star Wars franchise

=== Television ===
- "Vortex" (Star Trek: Deep Space Nine), a 1993 first-season episode of Star Trek: Deep Space Nine
- Vortex (Smallville), the first episode in Season 2 of Smallville
- Vortex (YTV), a defunct animation/animé programming block on YTV and hosted by Paula Lemyre and Stephanie Broschart
- Vortexx, a defunct Saturday morning children's programming block on American television network The CW

=== Fictional characters ===
- Vortex (Transformers), a member of the Combaticons from Transformers who transforms into a helicopter
- Cindy Vortex, a character in the Jimmy Neutron cartoon franchise
- Vortex, a character in the animated series Helluva Boss

== Gaming ==
- Vortex (Amiga video game), a 1989 video game from Visionary Design Technologies
- Vortex (SNES video game), a 1994 game developed by Argonaut Software for the Super Nintendo Entertainment System
- Vortex (PC game), a 1994 game developed by the X-Files development crew
- Vortex (iPod game), a 2006 iPod game developed by Apple Computer
- Vortex Software, a defunct video game developer
- Vortex (Dungeons & Dragons), a creature in the Dungeons & Dragons series
- Vortex, a video game modification manager made by Nexus Mods - see Nexus Mods § mod management

== Amusement rides ==
- Vortex (Calaway Park)
- Vortex (California's Great America), a stand-up roller coaster at California's Great America in Santa Clara, California, United States
- Vortex (Canada's Wonderland), a suspended roller coaster at Canada's Wonderland in Vaughan, Ontario, Canada
- Vortex (Carowinds), a stand-up roller coaster at Carowinds in Charlotte, North Carolina, United States
- Vortex (Kings Island), a steel roller coaster at Kings Island in Mason, Ohio, United States
- Vortex (Thorpe Park), at Thorpe Park, Surrey, England
- Vortex, a top spin ride at Sea World, Gold Coast, Australia

== Music ==
- ICS Vortex (born 1974), Norwegian metal singer and bassist
- Vortex I: A Biodegradable Festival of Life, a state-sponsored music festival held in 1970 in Estacada, Oregon
- Vortex Jazz Club, a London venue

=== Albums ===
- Vortex (Collide album), a remix album by Collide
- Vortex (Derek Sherinian album), a studio album by Derek Sherinian

=== Songs ===
- "Vortex" (song), a 2011 song by The Gazette
- "Vortex", a song by The Browning from Isolation
- "Vortex", a song by Burst from Prey on Life
- "Vortex", a song by Final Exposure (Joey Beltram and Richie Hawtin)
- "Vortex", a song by Jinjer from Wallflowers
- "Vortex", a song by Lizzy McAlpine from Older
- "Vortex", a song by Make Them Suffer from Worlds Apart
- "Vortex", a song by Megadeth from Cryptic Writings
- "Vortex", a song by Voivod from Negatron

== Technology and business ==
- Subaru Vortex, a sport coupe sold from 1985 to 1991 by Subaru
- Aureal Vortex, the PC audio accelerator chipset which powered such sound cards as the Monster Sound MX300
- Vortex (satellite), a class of United States Reconnaissance satellites
- Vortex mixer, a laboratory device used to mix vials of liquid
- Vortex86, a x86 compatible System-on-a-chip CPU
- Sport Copter Vortex, an American gyroplane design
- Vortex (software), a physics software development kit
- VORTEX projects, Verification of the Origins of Rotation in Tornadoes Experiment
- Vortex Bladeless, a Spanish company developing wind power generators
- Vortex Optics, an American maker of optical equipment
- Vortex ring toy, a toy that generates vortex rings
- Air vortex cannon, a toy that releases doughnut-shaped air vortices
- Vortex ring gun, an experimental non-lethal weapon for crowd control

== Other uses ==
- Spiritual vortex, in New Age thought, any of several places, such as Sedona, Arizona, where the earth's energy is purported to be released

== See also ==
- Vortex theory (disambiguation)
- Cyclonic vortex (disambiguation)
