= Vertex, Inc. =

American annuity software company

- Type: Public
- Traded as: Nasdaq: VERX
- Industry: Tax compliance software
- Founded: 1978; 48 years ago
- Founder: Ray Westphal
- Headquarters: King of Prussia, Pennsylvania, United States
- Area served: Worldwide
- Key people: Chris Young (president and CEO); John Schwab (CFO)
- Products: Vertex Indirect Tax O Series; Vertex Cloud Indirect Tax; Vertex Communications Tax; Vertex Payroll Tax On-Demand; Vertex Reporting & Analysis; Vertex Indirect Tax Returns; Vertex E-Invoicing; Vertex Tax Compliance; Vertex VAT Compliance
- Services: Vertex Sales & Use Tax Returns Outsourcing; Vertex Exemption Certificate Outsourcing
- Revenue: ▲US$748 million (2025)
- Net income: ▲US$7.21 million (2025)
- Number of employees: 1,100
- Website: vertexinc.com

Vertex, Inc. is a tax compliance software and services company based in King of Prussia, Pennsylvania, USA.

Vertex was founded in 1978 by Ray Westphal. Jeff Westphal, Stevie Westphal Thompson and Amanda Westphal Radcliffe purchased interest in the company from their father in 2000. On July 29, 2020, the company went public on the Nasdaq stock exchange.
