= Hallasan =

Volcano on Jeju Island, South Korea

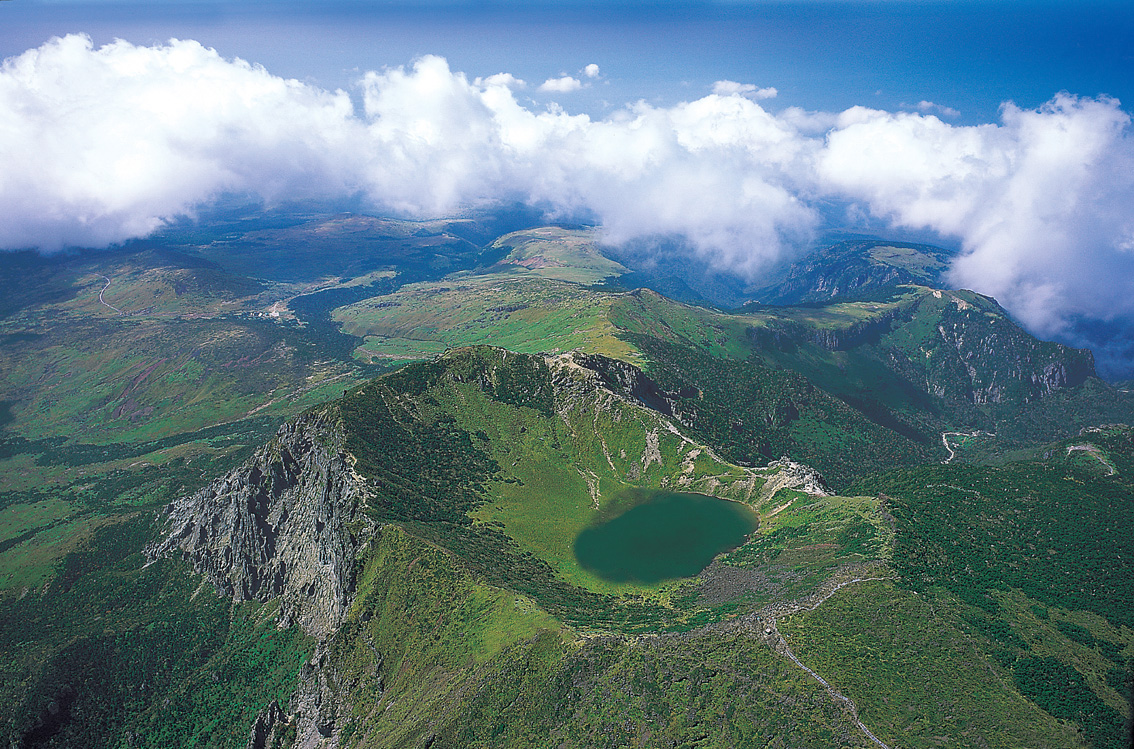
- View of the mountain from above (2011)

Highest point
- Elevation: 1,947.06 m (6,388.0 ft)
- Prominence: 1,947.06 m (6,388.0 ft)
- Listing: Country high point Ultra, Ribu
- Coordinates: 33°21′42″N 126°31′45″E

Geography
- Location: Jeju Province, South Korea

Geology
- Mountain type: Shield volcano
- Last eruption: 1007 CE

Climbing
- Easiest route: Trails, helicopter

Korean name
- Hangul: 한라산
- Hanja: 漢拏山
- RR: Hallasan
- MR: Hallasan

North Korean name
- Hangul: 한나산
- Hanja: 漢拏山
- RR: Hannasan
- MR: Hannasan

Hallasan (Korean: 한라산) is a shield volcano comprising much of Jeju Island in South Korea. Its summit, at 1,947 m (6,388 ft), is the highest point in the country. The area around the mountain is a designated national park, named Hallasan National Park. Hallasan is commonly considered to be one of the three main mountains of South Korea, along with Jirisan and Seoraksan.

The Hallasan Natural Reserve was designated as a South Korean Natural Monument number 182 on October 12, 1966.

== Names ==
Alternate English names for the mountain include Hanla Mountain and Mount Halla, and older English sources refer to the peak as Mount Auckland. Hallasan is written in Hangul as if it were Hanrasan (한라산), but is still pronounced Hallasan. In the past, Hallasan has been known by numerous other names in Korean including Buak (부악; 釜岳), Wonsan (원산; 圓山), Jinsan (진산; 鎭山), Seonsan (선산; 仙山), Dumuak (두무악; 頭無岳), Burasan (부라산; 浮羅山), Yeongjusan (영주산; 瀛州山), and Hyeolmangbong (혈망봉; 穴望峯).

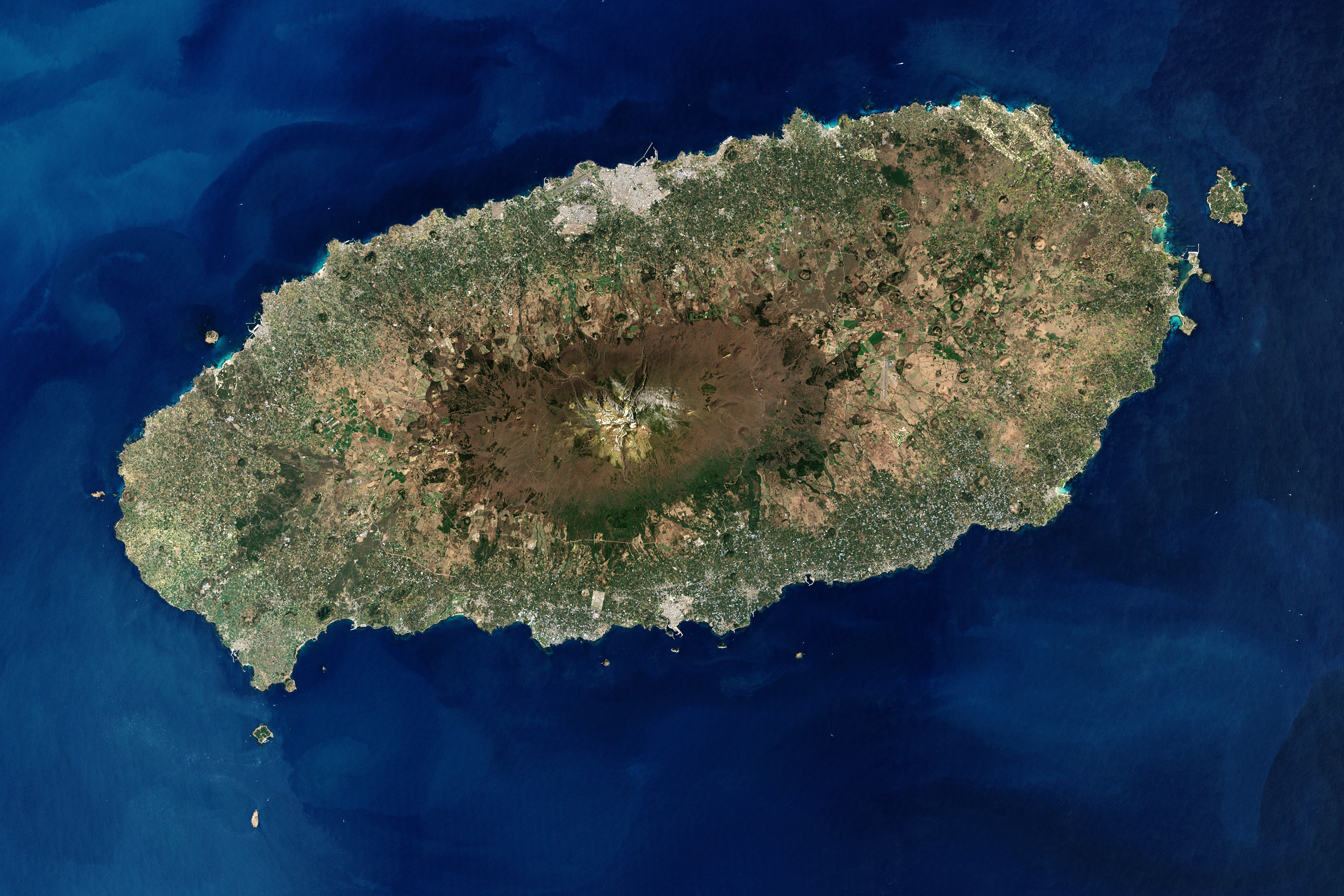
Satellite image showing Hallasan at the center of Jeju Island (2000)

== Geology and geography ==
=== Hallasan ===
Hallasan is a massive shield volcano which forms the bulk of Jeju Island and is often taken as representing the island itself. There is a Korean traditional local saying that "Jeju Island is Hallasan, and Hallasan is Jeju." The mountain can indeed be seen from all places on the island, but its peak is often covered in clouds.

The soil of Hallasan is mostly made out of volcanic ash, volcanic sand, and lapilli. The organic contents of the soil are higher than any other soil in South Korea, and drainage is also better than any other place in South Korea, but its soil is relatively infertile. The volcanic island was constructed, starting in the Pliocene epoch, on the continental shelf, which is about 100 m (300 ft) below sea level in the area. Eruptions of basalt and trachyte lava built the island above sea level, and it now reaches a height of 1,950 metres (6,398 ft). A large volcanic crater over 400 metres (1,312 ft) in diameter tops the volcano. About 360 parasitic cones, or oreum (오름) in the Jeju language, are found on the volcano's flanks. Most of them are cinder cones and scoria cones, but there are also some lava domes and about 20 tuff rings near the coast and offshore, which were formed by underwater phreatic eruptions. According to Goryeosa, its last eruption was in 1007 CE, while geological evidence suggests its last eruption was around at least 2,000 years ago. This puts the volcano into the active classification, meaning it has erupted in the last 10,000 years. The designation as active is not agreed to by all, as more monitoring and study are needed to better understand the volcano.

=== Baengnokdam ===
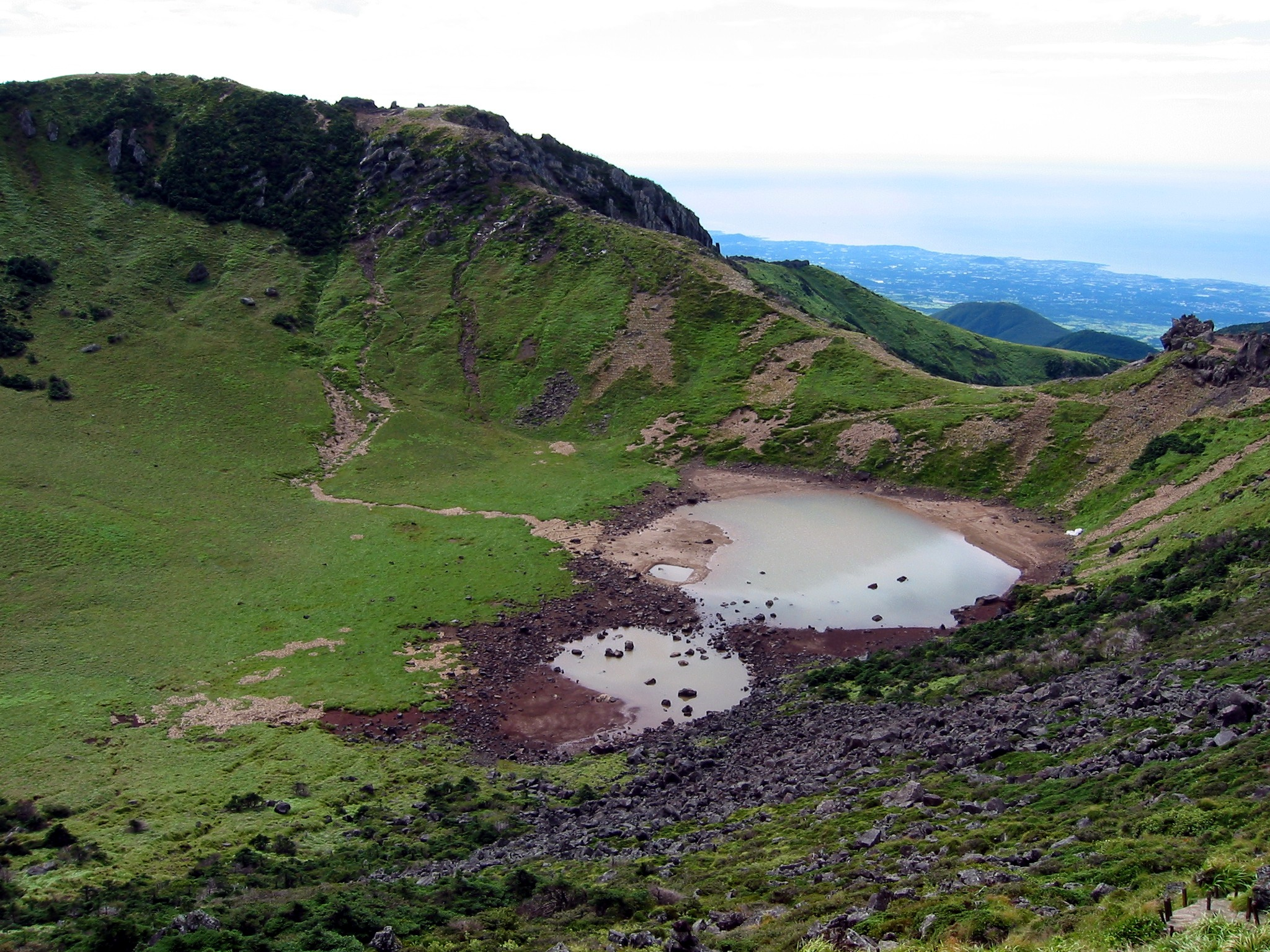
The crater lake Baengnokdam (November 2012)

There is a crater lake on Hallasan called Baengnokdam (백록담; 白鹿潭), meaning "white deer lake". It is formed by the collapse of the top of the ridge by the movement of magma underground. There is a legend attributing the name of the lake to otherworldly men who descend from heaven to play with white deer. Depending on the season, the circumference of the lake is up to 2 kilometres (1.2 mi) with a depth up to about 100 metres (330 ft).

The configurative rocks of the eastern and western walls of Baengnokdam are different. The eastern wall is covered with basalt lava 2–5 metres (6 ft 7 in – 16 ft 5 in) thick at its top. In the lower part, there is a high-concentration stream sediment layer of the Tamna layer. The western wall is made of the trachyte lava dome. The volcanic wall formed by the eruption of the lava should be composed of lava, analysis. However, the eastern wall is composed of the clastic sedimentary sediments, so it is not a crater by lava eruption but a pit crater. Namely, the trachyte magma, which formed the Baengnokdam trachyte, was elevated on the dome, and the trachyte magma formed lava dome at its top. The inclination and direction of the Tamna Formation of Baengnokdam cannot be measured directly at Baengnokdam, but it is N10W of slope and 30NE of slope measured near the valley below North Baengnokdam, 1,580 metres (5,180 ft) above sea level.

=== Impact of topography ===
==== Tendency of wind change by Hallasan ====
In order to understand the tendency of temperature change in Jeju Island, the short-term forecasting model of Halla, the weather data of the Korean peninsula, and the wind vectors from the AWS are analyzed. When the south winds flow into the sea, sea winds form around Hallasan, and a sea breeze is formed on the downwind side of the sea. On the coast, winds and the sea breezes gather around the coasts to form a persistent eddy, and the highest temperature occurs in the region where the eddy occurs.

==== Tendency of maximum temperature by Hallasan ====
In order to understand the tendency of maximum temperature in Jeju Island, the area where the highest temperature occurred when the wind was weak was surveyed and analyzed. In the morning, when the reverse layer is formed and the wind is weak, the warm air of the lower layer is raised when the air movement between the upper and lower layers is blocked, and it is placed on the upper floor by the sea breeze, which affects the temperature rise in the mid-mountainous area.

The occurrence of the highest temperature coincides with the formation position of the eddy, and when the wind is weak, the eddy forms in the middle mountain region. When the wind is weak, the warmth is accumulated in the middle layer, so the maximum temperature in the mid-mountainous area is higher than the maximum temperature of the low-altitude coastal area by about 1–3 °C (1.8–5.4 °F), and 4 °C (7.2 °F) or higher on the downwind side.

When the wind is blowing at 4–9 metres per second (13–30 ft/s), a weak sea breeze coming from the sea is formed on the coastal area and peak temperatures are mainly observed during the daytime.

==== Tendency of minimum temperature by Hallasan ====
The change of the minimum temperature varies depending on the degree of cooling of Hallasan and the intensity of the wind speed. When the wind blows due to the predominant sea breeze, the air cooled in Hallasan descends to the coastal area and induces a decrease in temperature. When the synoptic wind blows strongly, the cold air of Hallasan moves to the downwind side and the lowest temperature appears. The lowest temperature in the downwind area is 2–5 °C (3.6–9.0 °F) lower than in other areas, and the lowest temperature often occurs at night.

When the weak northwestern synoptic winds blow, low temperatures occur in the eastern part of Jeju Island. The chill of the top of Hallasan descends downhill along the mountain range and is collected in the eastern part of Jeju Island so the morning temperature drops considerably.

==== Inter-regional temperature variation by Hallasan ====
For the last five years, the deviation of temperature (maximum temperature - minimum temperature) increased in spring between March and May. The reason for the large deviation in spring is because the phenomenon occurs frequently by Hallasan.

== Ecosystem ==
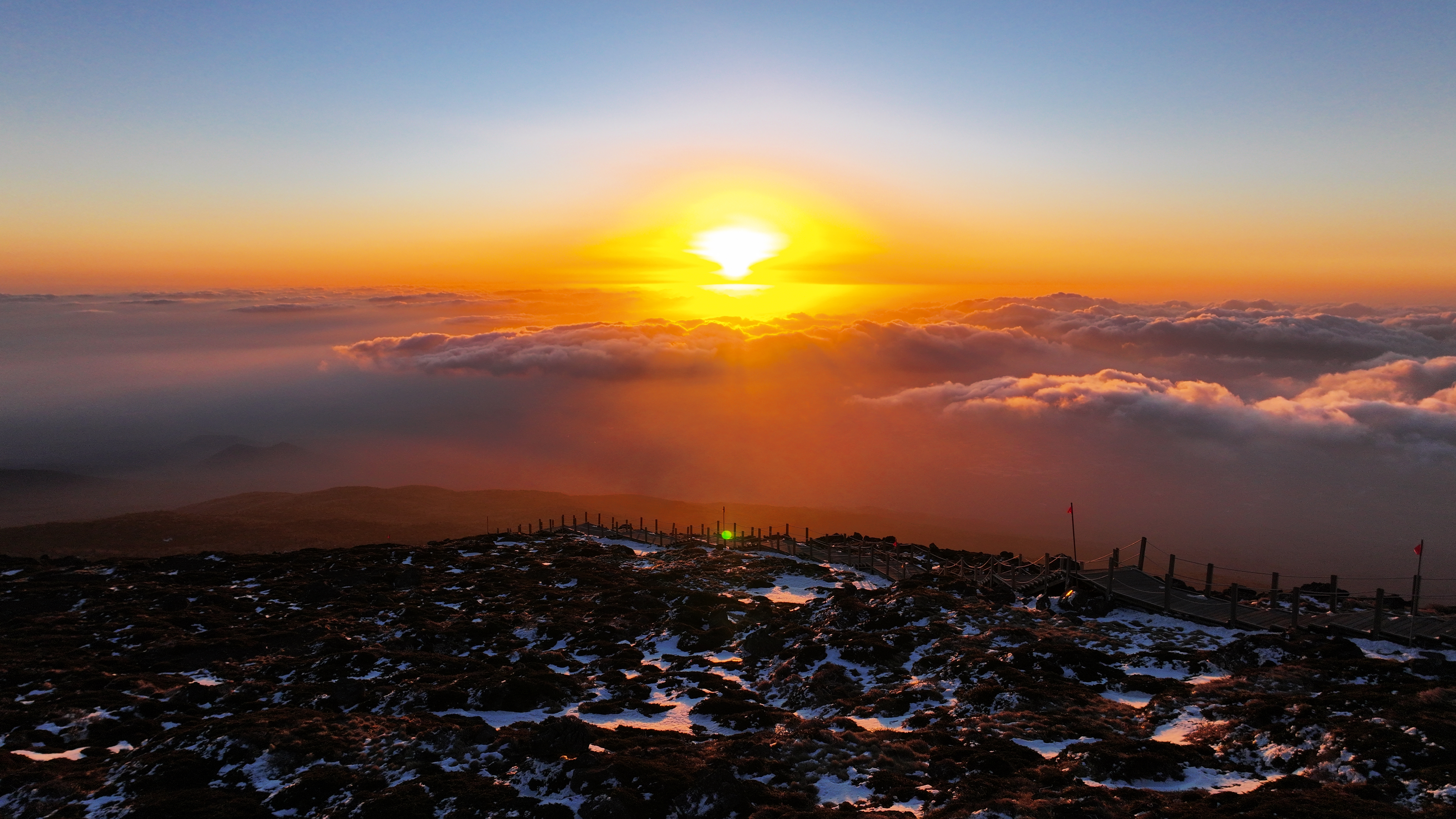
Hallasan sunrise

Hallasan was isolated from the mainland for a long time and its species were able to become unique and different from mainland species. The elevation of the mountain causes various plant species to live there. The mountain became a habitat for plants that live in low elevation and plants that live in high elevation. 50 or more unique species live in Jeju Island, especially in high elevation area in Hallasan. Various animal species also live on the mountain. Because of the geography of the mountain, the same species evolved in different ways after thousands of years. Just like plant species, animal species originally living in cold and hot climates use the mountain as their habitat. There are a total of 121 bird species that use Hallasan as a habitat. Only 19 species are considered as a natural monument and protected by the government. Ravens are commonly seen in the hiking trail. A total of 4,300 insect species live on the mountain. 254 spider species also live there. A study found that spider habitat is concentrated more on the north side of the mountain. Ticks live on the mountain and caused much damage to Jeju residents long ago. The damage caused by ticks continues. Six tick species cause problems for domestic animals.

=== Flora ===
According to the world floral region, Hallasan belongs to the temperate subregion with Yangtze River basin and southwest Japan. From the coast to the top of the Hallasan, plants are distributed vertically from the subtropical plants to the alpine plants due to the environmental gradient. Of the 4,000 species of vascular plants native to Korea, about 400 species are estimated to be endangered or potentially rare. Especially, 23 species-specific wild plants designated by the Ministry of Environment (a total of 59 species) are distributed in Jeju Island and 6 of them can be found in the natural reserve area of Hallasan. Also, about 50 kinds of special plants are distributed in Jeju Island, especially in the highlands of Hallasan.

=== Fauna ===
Because of the geographical character of the island, there are many subspecies due to isolation even though they are the same species. Also, Hallasan is a place where the polar animal and the tropical animal coexist due to the difference of the climate zone according to the elevation.

==== Mammals ====
The mammals of Jeju Island are distributed among five orders and 114 families and five species. Thus, the distribution of mammals in Jeju Island is very poor in species and numbers because Jeju island became isolated from the Korean peninsula long ago. Their population has declined due to the decrease in food because of the use of rodenticides and pesticides in recent years and indiscreet fishing. Weasels, badgers, and gazelles inhabit Hallasan. The number of weasels and badgers is declining. Tiger, boar and Formosan deer are already extinct. Roe deer, the largest mammal in Hallasan, was once in danger of extinction, but now its population has increased due to protection policies and much effort by the islanders.

==== Amphibians and reptiles ====
Most amphibians and reptiles on Jeju Island are indigenous animals but there are some invasive species from Japan and China. Mt. Halla is particularly well-suited for amphibians and reptiles as a hideout, with well-developed grasslands and marshlands, and is rich in food.

==== Birds ====
There are 364 kinds of birds in Jeju Island, 91 kinds of passing birds, 100 kinds of birds in winter, 42 kinds of resident birds and 43 kinds of vagrants. Among the birds in Jeju Island, except for the species that live in habitat for migratory birds and coastal regions, there are 160 species mainly inhabiting Mt. Halla. There are 19 species designated as natural monuments.

== Temple ==
The mountain is home to Gwaneumsa (관음사; 觀音寺), the oldest Buddhist temple on the island. The temple was originally built during the Goryeo period (1046–1083) during the reign of King Munjong. Like many other temples in Korea, Gwaneumsa was destroyed in 1702 and closed for 200 years. The temple was rebuilt in 1908. It propagates Buddhism again in Jeju Island. There is a memorial site outside the temple to commemorate the victims of the Jeju uprising that took place between 1948 and 1950. It is one of the most visited places on the island.

The mountain is also the location of Jonjaamji, a pagoda preserving relics of the Buddha.

== Trails ==
There are five hiking trails on Hallasan.

- Gwaneumsa Trail (관음사 탐방로/觀音寺 探訪路) - 8.7 km
- Eorimok Trail (어리목 탐방로/어리목 探訪路) - 4.7 km
- Seongpanak Trail (성판악 탐방로/城板岳 探訪路) - 9.6 km
- Yeongsil Trail (영실 탐방로/靈室 探訪路) - 3.7 km
- Donnaeko Trail (돈내코 탐방로/돈내코探訪路) - 9.1 km

The Donnaeko trail was reopened to the public on December 4, 2009, after a fifteen-year hiatus. Only the Gwaneumsa and Seongpanak trails lead to the summit. The Donnaeko, Eorimok and Yeongsil courses only go as far as Witse Oreum (윗세오름), as the rest of the trail leading to the peak has been closed off since 1994 in order to restore and protect the vegetation.

== Transport ==
=== Gwaneumsa Trail ===
To go to Gwaneumsa Trail by car, you should use road number 1117 which connects Jeju Arra-dong Mountain and Tamra Education Center and Cheon-Wangsa. From Jeju city hall to Gwaneumsa Information Center, it takes about 25 minutes and from Seogwipo city hall, it takes about 50 minutes. If you want to use public transportation, ride Jeju city bus number 475. This bus does not enter the city, so riders have to get off and transfer at the entrance of Jeju University. In the past, it operated only on weekends and holidays, but it can be used on weekdays since the 2017 bus route reorganization. If you have to take a bus to Jeju city or Seogwipo city, the closest stop is Jeju medical center at 5.16 road. It takes about 40~50 minutes on foot. This bus comes until 20:20.

=== Eorimok Trail ===
To go to Eorimok Trail by car, you should use road number 1139 (or 1100), which connect Jeju City and Seogwipo City Jungmun-dong. From Jeju city hall, it takes about 35 minutes and from Jungmun-dong, it takes about 50 minutes. If you want to use public transportation, ride bus number 240. (Dispense interval about 1hr.)

=== Seongpanak Trail ===
To go to Seongpanak Trail by car, you should use road number 1131 (or 516) which connect Jeju city and Seogwipo city. From Jeju city hall to the Seongpanak Information Center, it takes about 30 minutes. From Seogwipo city hall, it takes about 40 minutes. If you want to use public transportation, ride buses on road 516, which are 181, 182, 281. Since these buses come in an interval of only 10~15 minutes, the route with the best accessibility is this route.

=== Yeongsil Trail ===
The Yeongsil Trail is connected to the Gwaneumsa Trail by road number 1100. This makes the transportation information really similar. Actually, the way of public transportation is same. But the time to come and go is quite different since these two trails are 30 minutes away by car. From Jeju city hall to the Yeongsil Information Center, it takes about 50 minutes. From Jungmun to Yeongsil Information Center, it takes about 30 minutes.

=== Donnaeko Trail ===
To go to Donnaeko Trail by car, you should use road number 1115 which connects Jeju city Araun mountain river, Tamra education center, and Chunwangsa temple. From Jeju city hall to Donnaeko Information Center, it takes about 60 minutes and from Seogwipo city hall, it takes about 25 minutes. If you want to use public transportation, ride Seogwipo city bus 610-1. This bus goes to the mourning gallery (충혼묘지, which is the entrance) only 6 times a day. It takes about 40~50 minutes on foot.

== Gallery ==
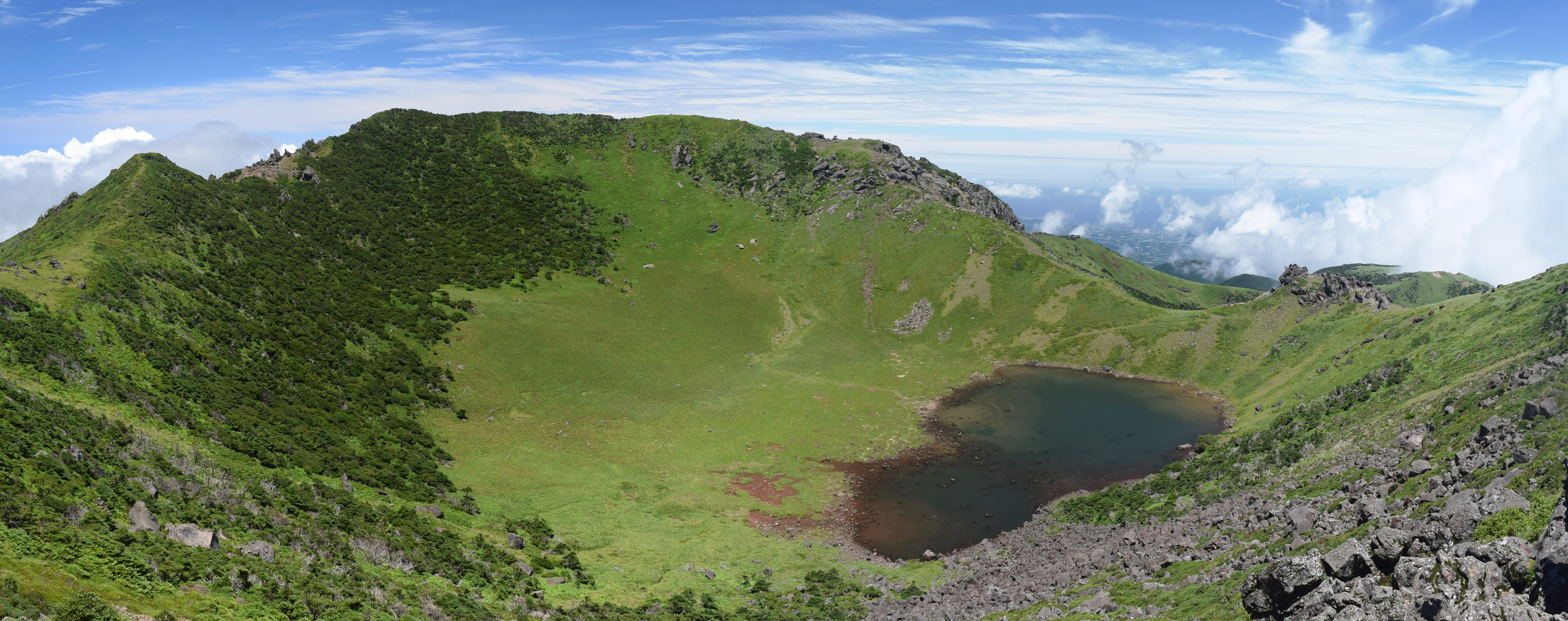
A picture of Baengnokdam Crater Lake of Hallasan, Jeju Island, Korea
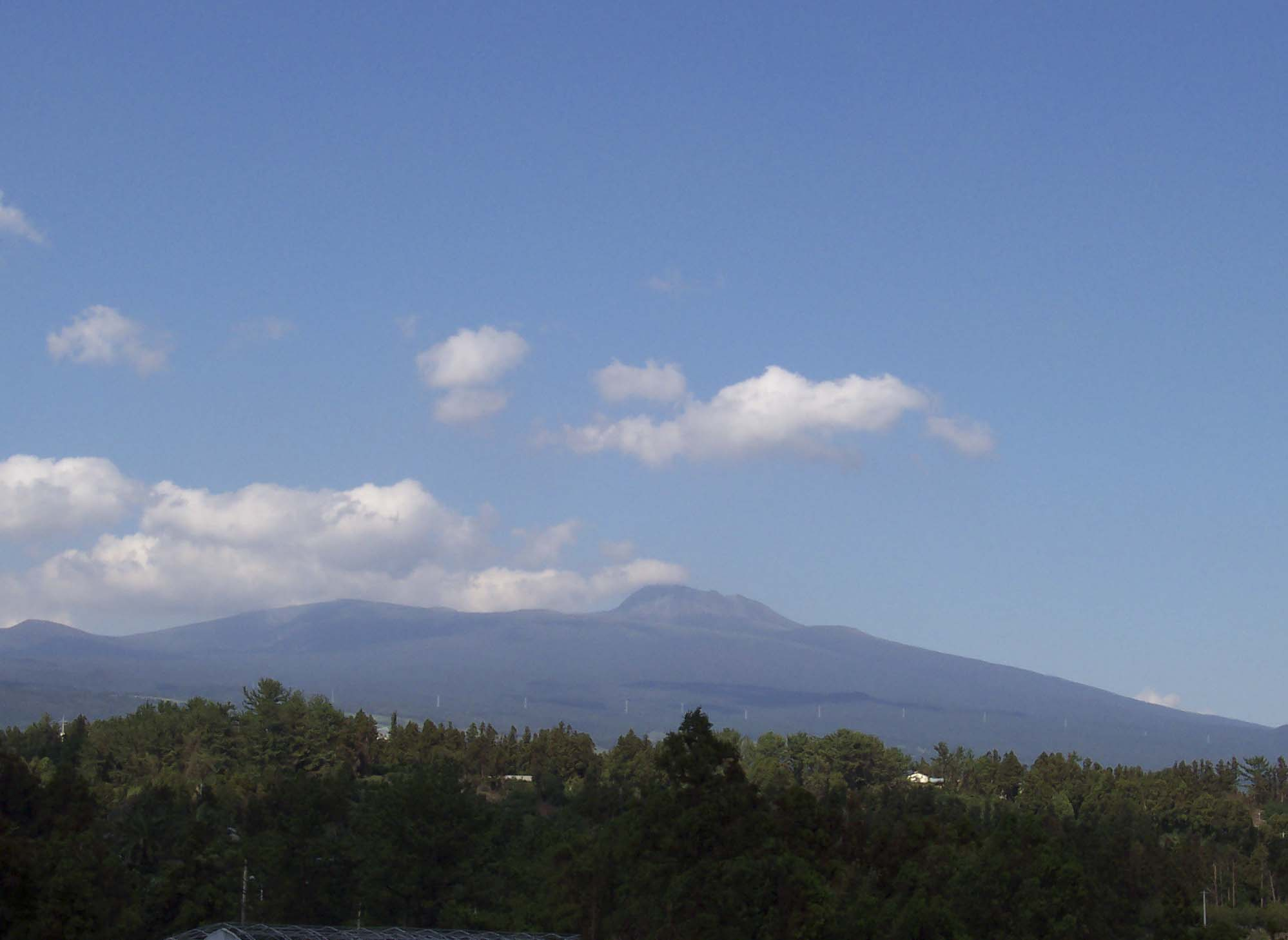
Hallasan seen from a distance

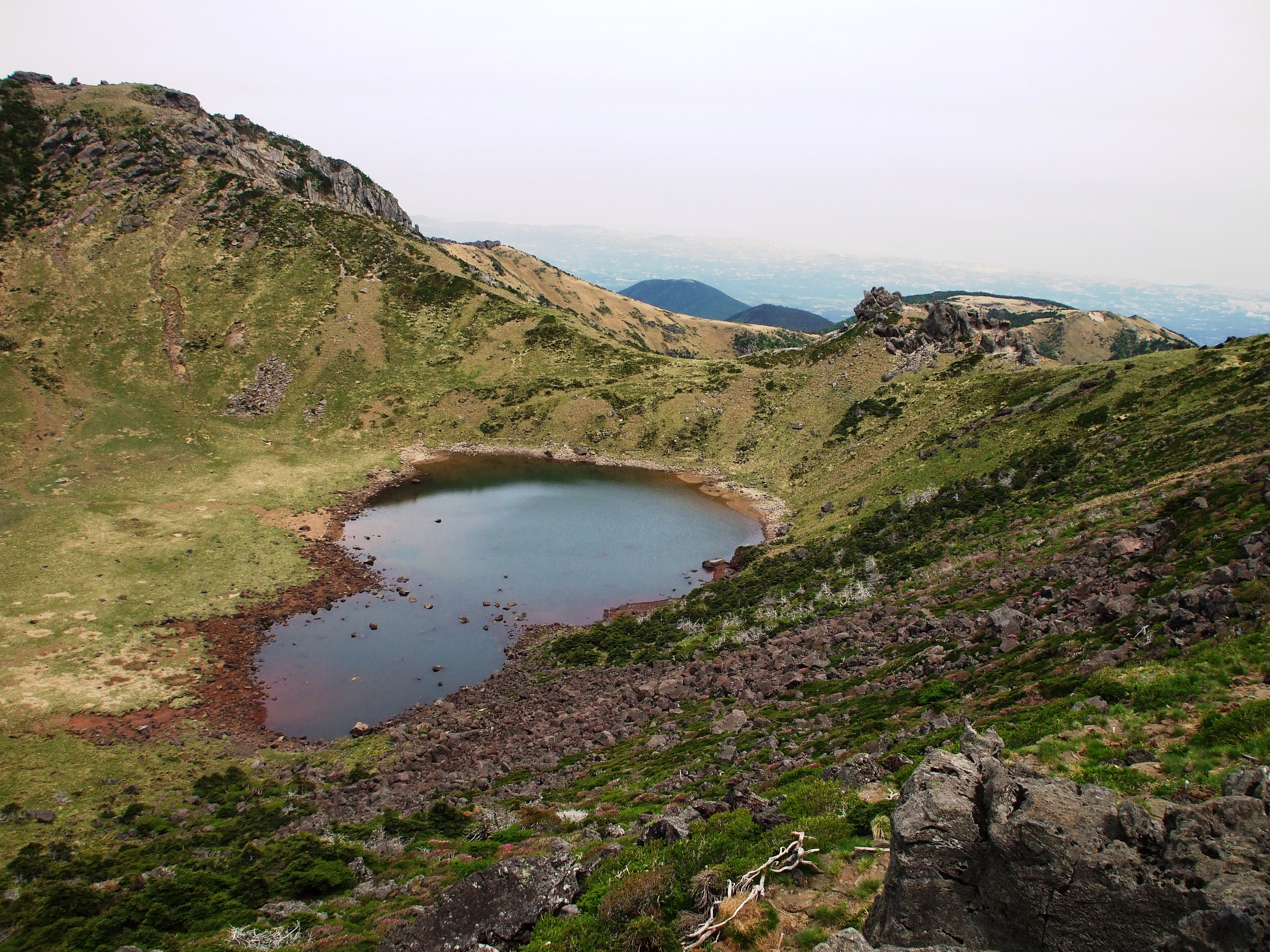
Crater lake at the top of the mountain (06/2008)

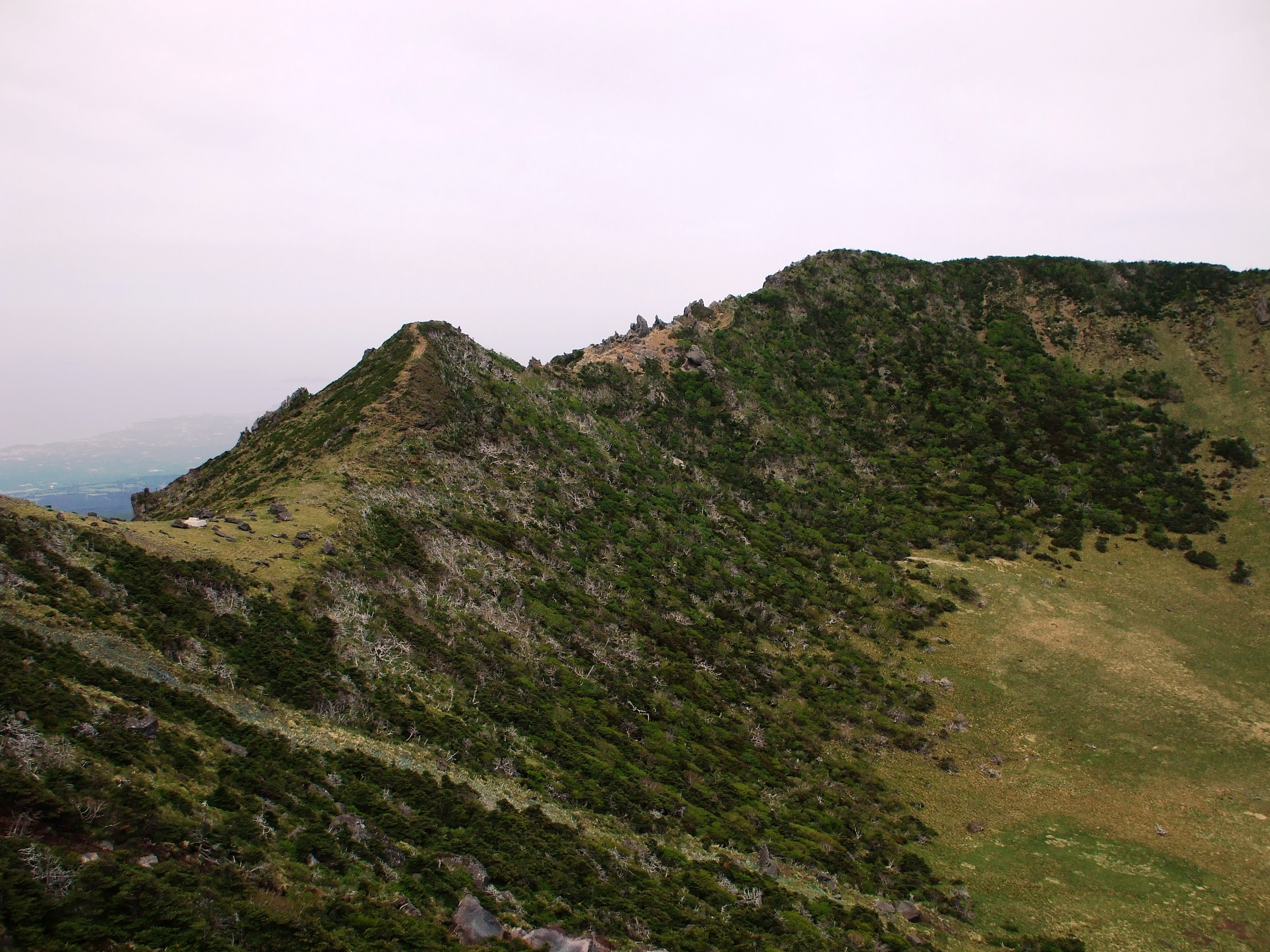
A view at the top (06/2008)

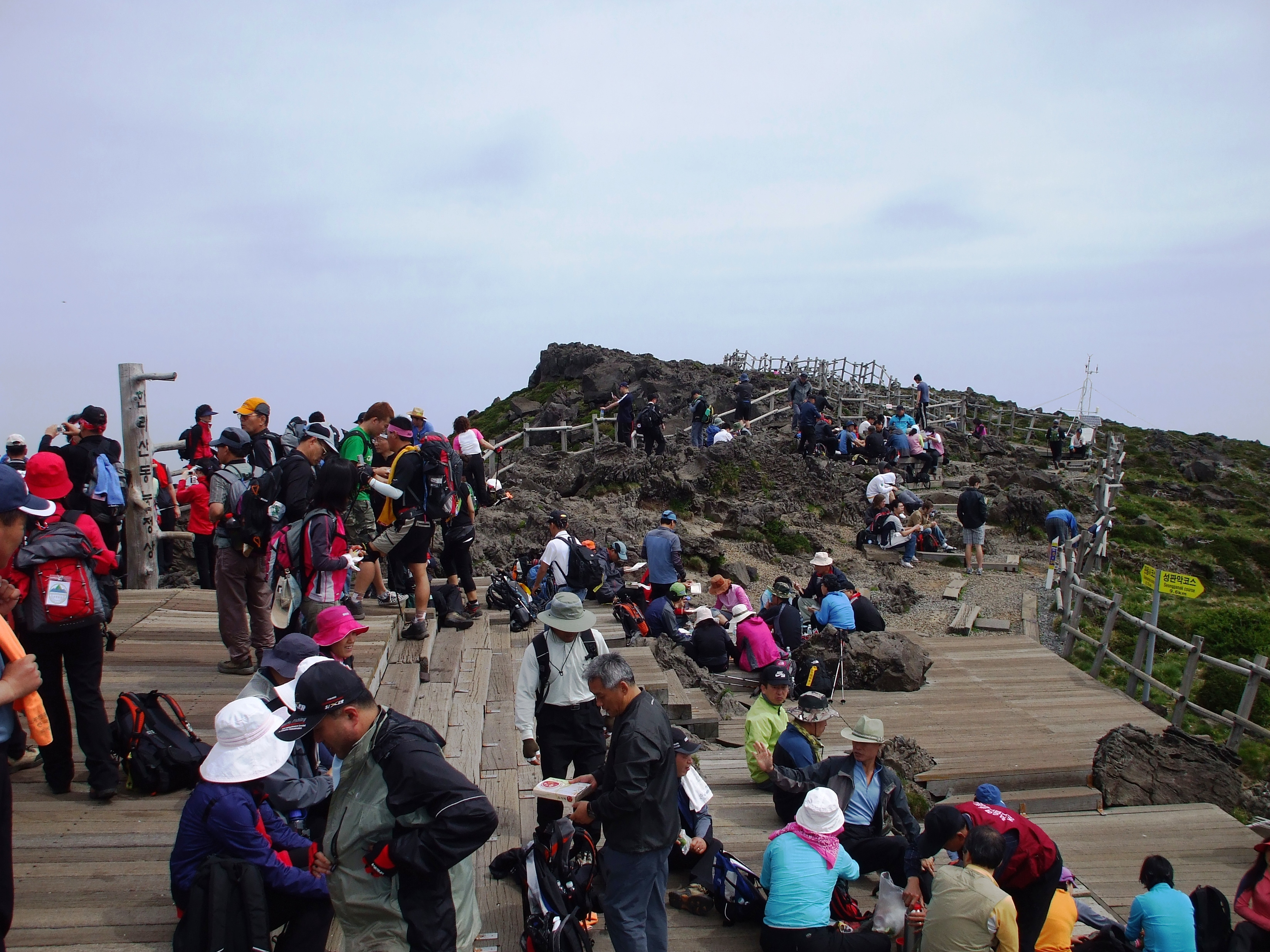
A surging crowd at the top of the mountain (06/2008)

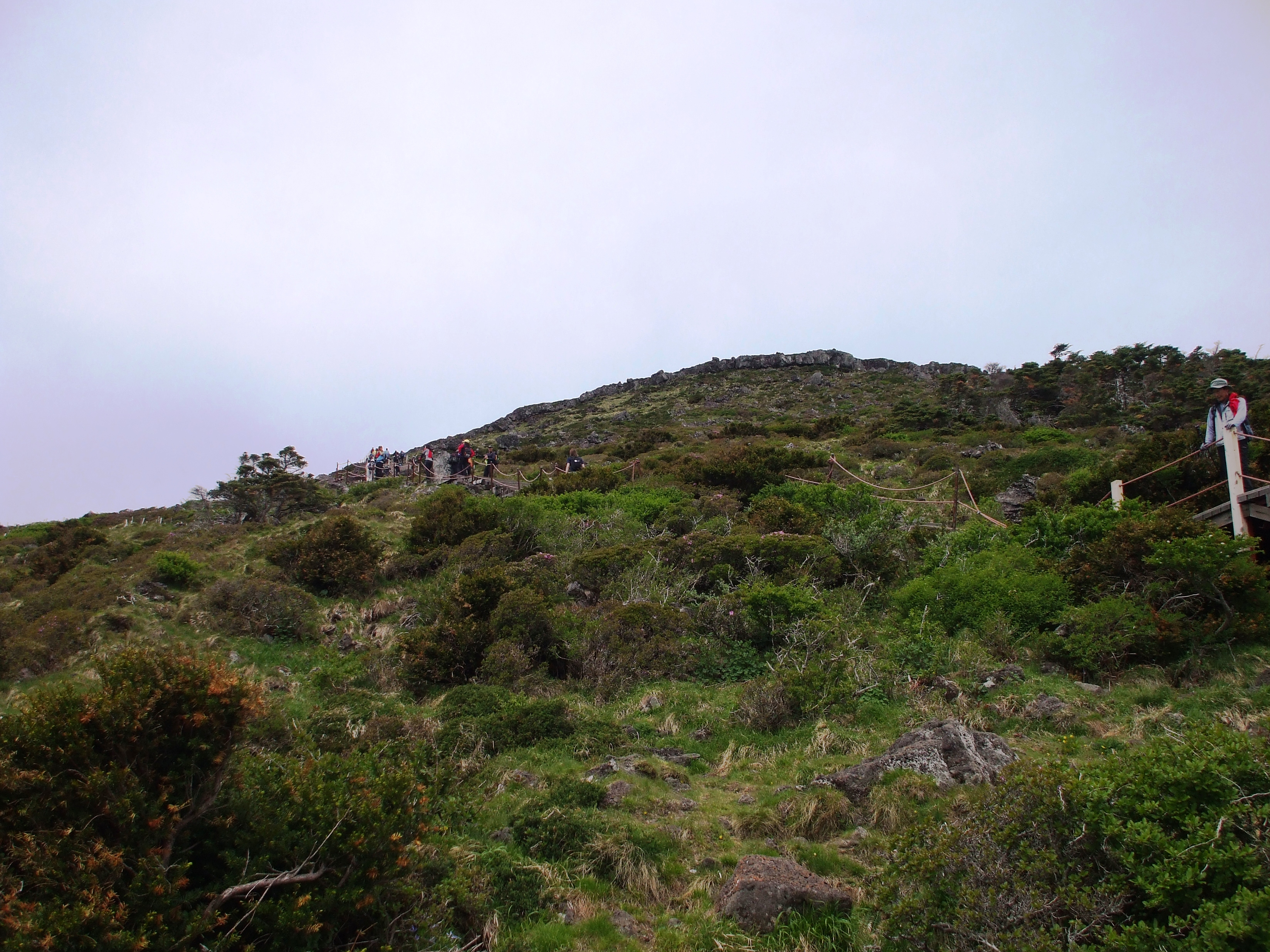
At the middle of the Seongpanak trail (02/2008)

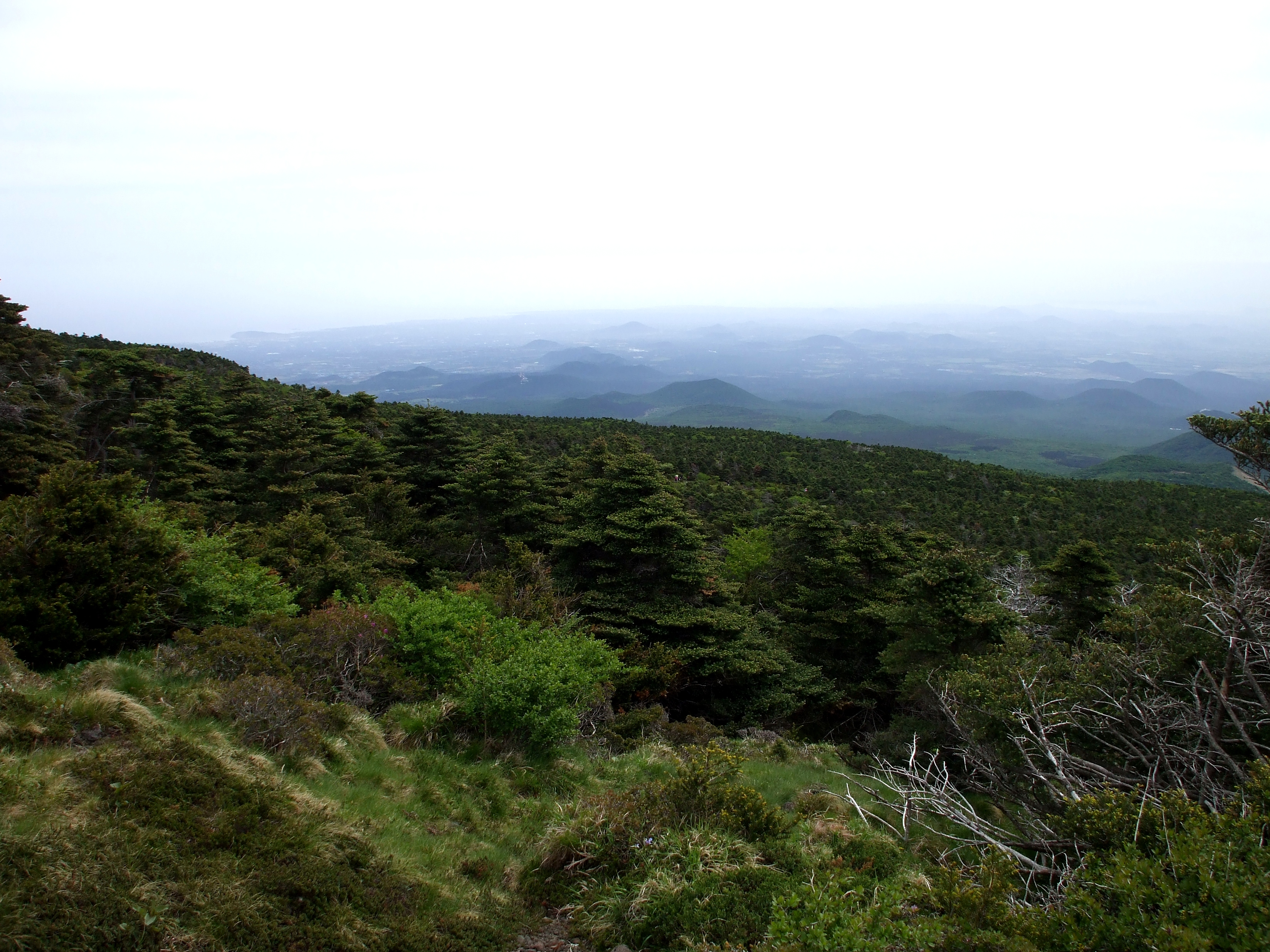
Lateral volcanoes of the mountain (06/2008)

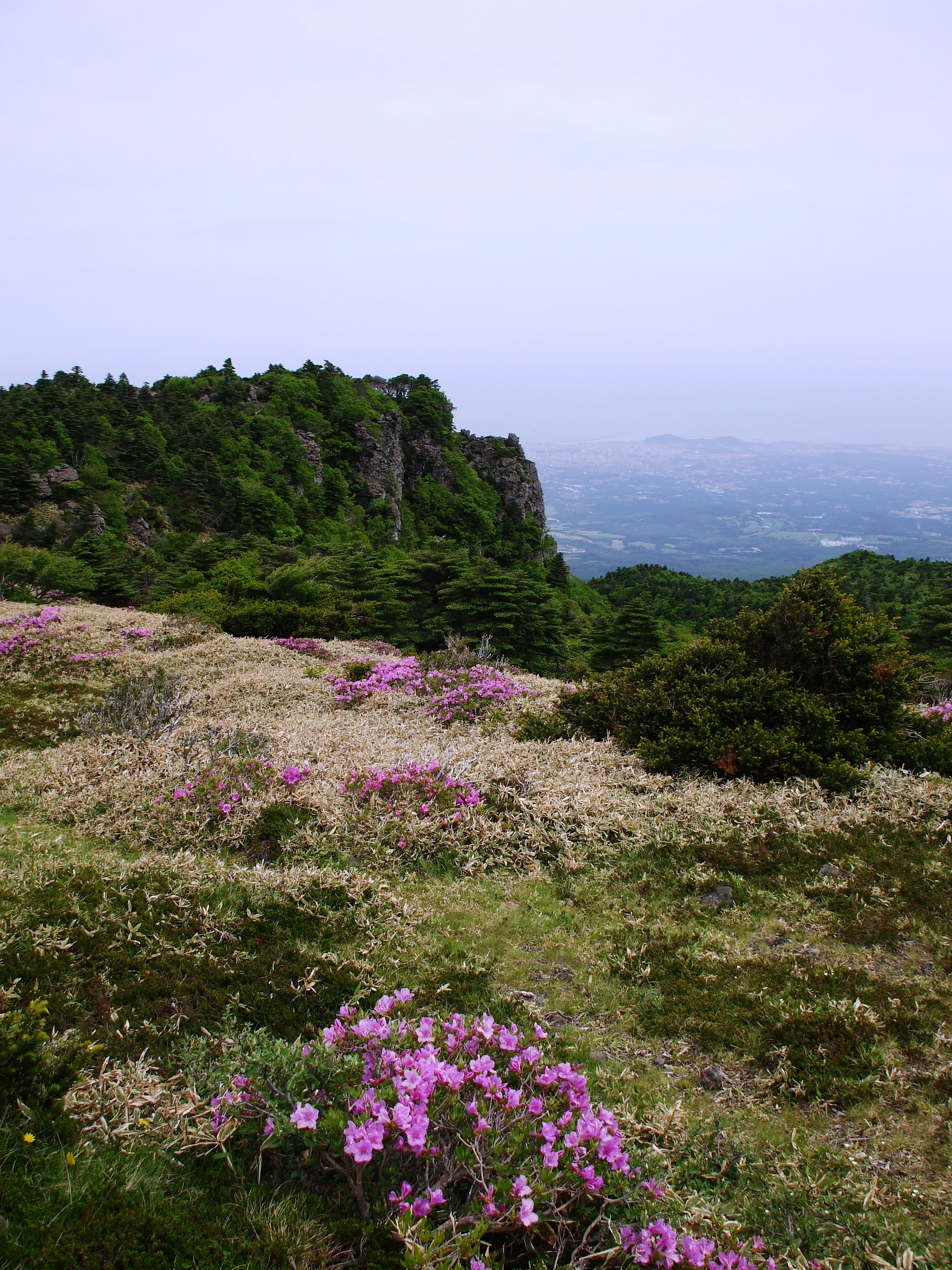
A view on the Gwaneumsa trail (06/2008)

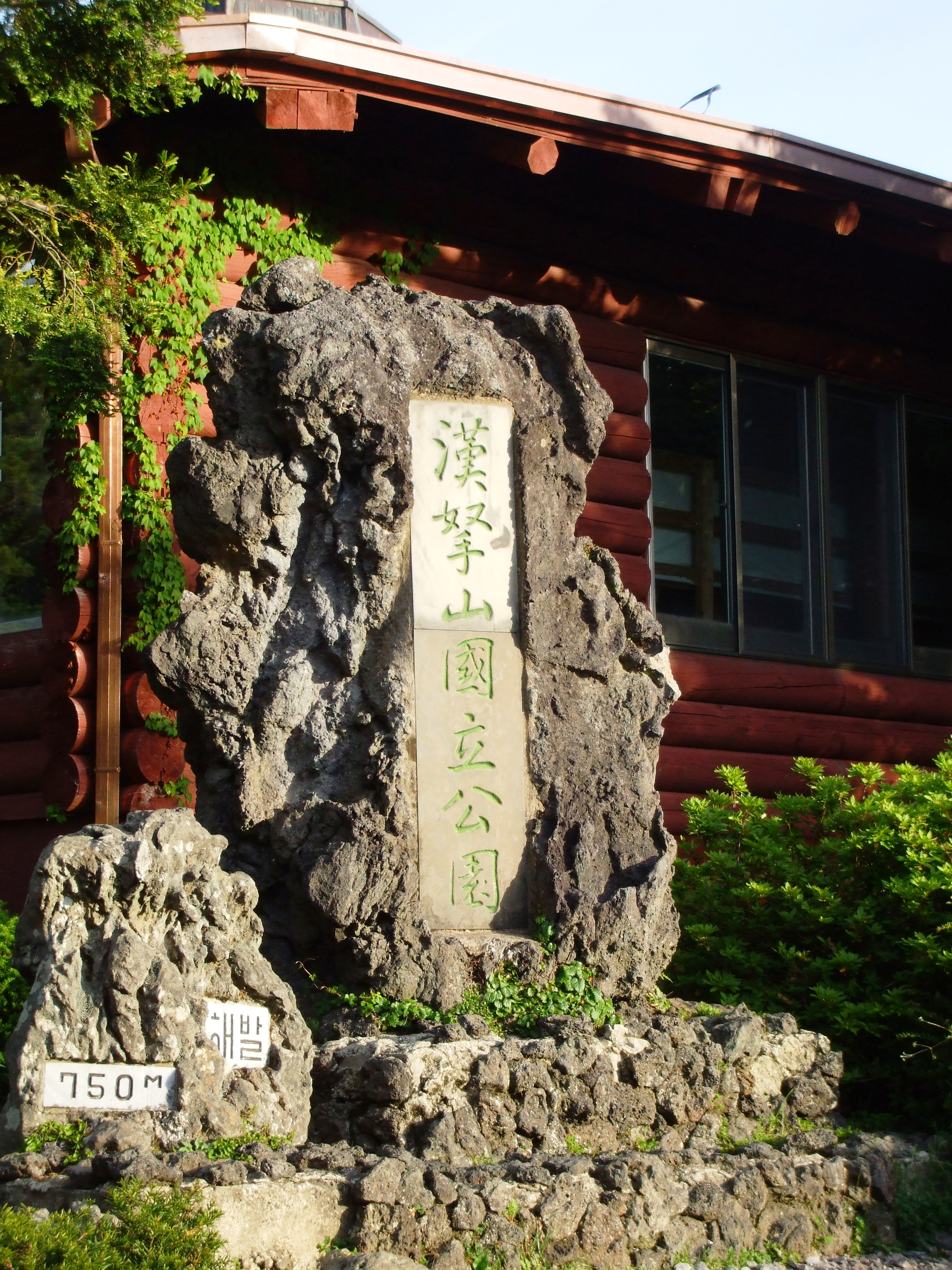
A monument at the gate of the Seonphanak trail (06/2008)

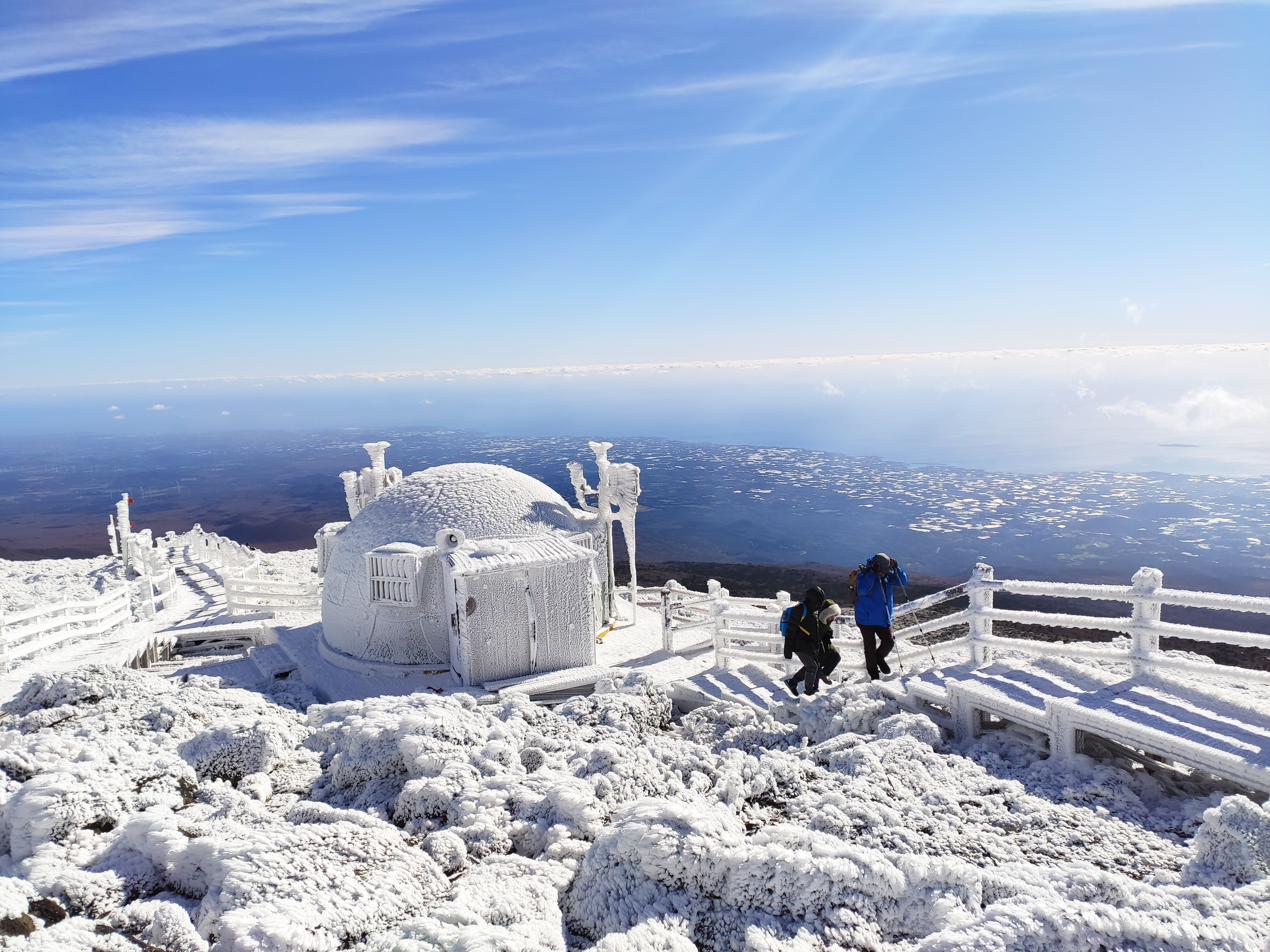
Hallasan and its summit weather station covered with windswept ice on a cold November afternoon, overlooking the Yellow Sea

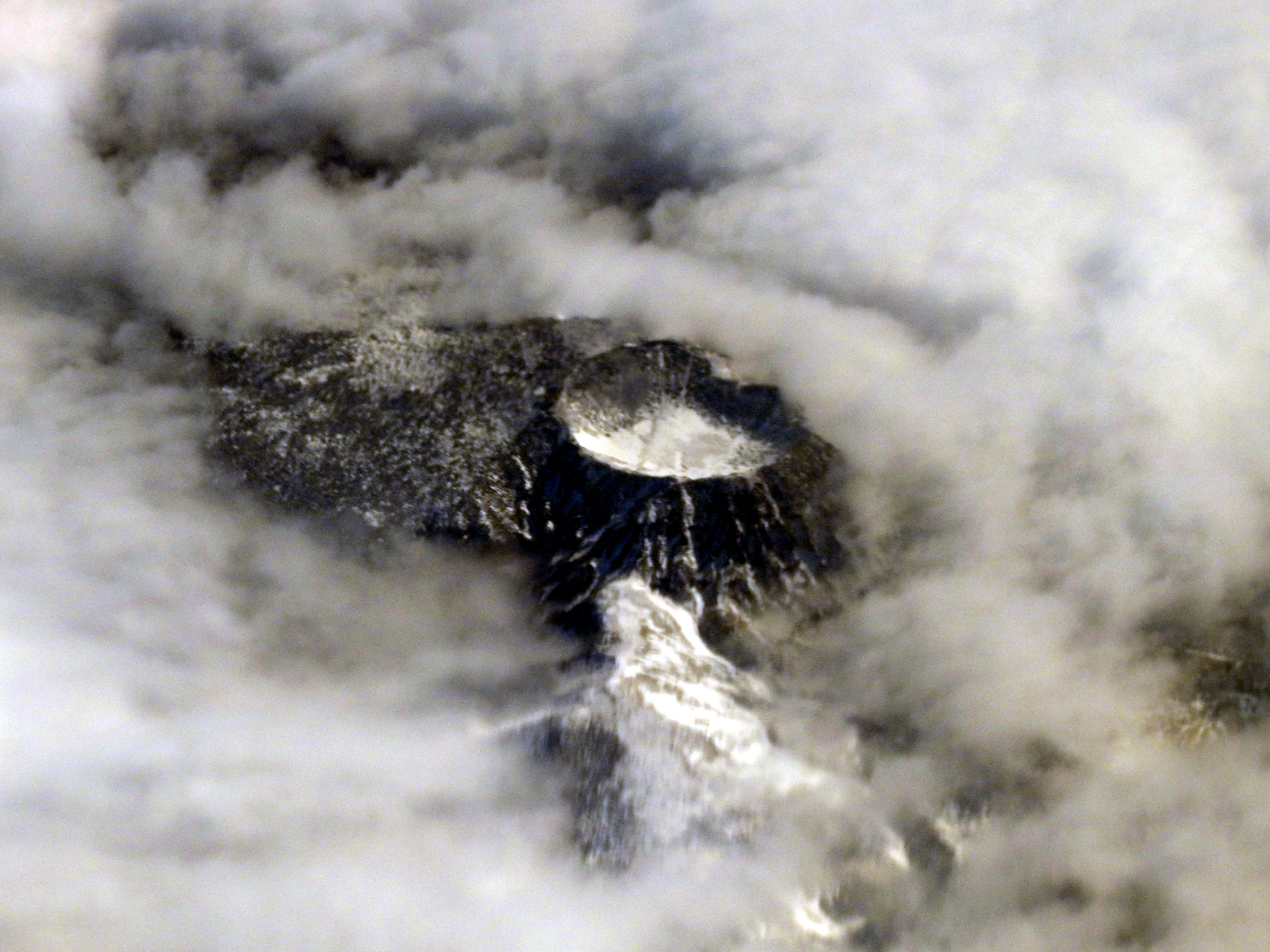
Hallasan seen from a plane

== See also ==
- Kármán vortex street
- Power spot (spirituality)
- List of ultras of Northeast Asia
- List of volcanoes in Korea
