= Cyclonic vortex =

Cyclonic vortex may refer to:

- Upper tropospheric cyclonic vortex, a vortex that usually moves slowly from east-northeast to west-southwest, and generally does not extend below 20,000 feet in altitude.
- Low-level tropospheric cyclonic vortices are known as low-pressure areas
