= Vortex theory =

Vortex theory may refer to:

- Mechanical explanations of gravitation
- Vortex theory of the atom
- History of knot theory
- Vortex Theory (motorsports)
- Insect flight#Leading edge vortex
