= Masuaki Kiyota =

Japanese psychic (born 1962)

Masuaki Kiyota (清田 益章, Kiyota Masuaki, born 1962) is a Japanese psychic known for his alleged ability of thoughtography.

Kiyota was tested by investigators in London by Granada Television and the results were negative. It was discovered that with tight controls, Kiyota was unable to project mental images onto film. He could only achieve success when he had the film in his possession without any control for at least 2 hours.

Kiyota feats such as metal bending were endorsed by Walter and Mary Jo Uphoff as evidence for psychokinesis. However, skeptics and magicians have written that Kiyota is a clever "trickster" who performed his feats by magic tricks. According to James Randi "Kiyota's Polaroid photos were apparently produced by preexposing the film, since it was noted that he made great efforts to obtain a film pack and spend time with it in private." In a 1984 television interview, Kiyota confessed to fraud.
