= Vertex Resource Group =

Vertex Resource Group Ltd.
- Company type: Public
- Traded as: TSX-V: VTX
- Industry: Environmental, Oil and gas, Utilities, Municipalities
- Founded: 1962
- Founder: Terry Stephenson (President & CEO)
- Headquarters: Sherwood Park, Alberta, Canada
- Services: Environmental
- Revenue: ▲$150.4 million(2018)
- Website: www.vertex.ca

Vertex Resource Group Ltd. (Vertex) is a publicly traded environmental services company based in Sherwood Park and is traded on the TSX Venture Exchange, under the stock symbol VTX. Terry Stephenson has been president since 2005.

The company has expanded through organic growth and acquisitions to provide services across Western Canada and within select regions of the United States.

== History ==
=== 1962 - 2012 ===
Vertex has roots dating back to 1962, the date in which the acquired company Three Star Trucking Ltd. was established.

=== 2012 - Present ===
In 2014, Vertex acquired Navus Environmental Inc. Vertex was also named a Gold Standard Winner of Canada's Best Managed Companies. In 2015, Vertex acquired Ignite Energy Services Ltd., Glacier Ridge Ventures Ltd., and Tar Energy Services Ltd.

On October 18, 2017, Vertex became a publicly traded company with common shares traded on the Toronto Venture Stock Exchange.

In 2018, Vertex acquired HMA Land Services, Sonic Oilfield Services Ltd. TSL Industries, a private company providing hydrovac services to the Edmonton, Alberta region and Three Star Trucking Ltd.

== Operations ==
Vertex has 28 Office locations across North America including: Sherwood Park, Calgary, Alida, Calmar, Carlsbad, Dawson Creek, Edam, Fort McMurray, Fort Nelson, Fort St. John, Grande Prairie, Houston, Kindersley, Kola, Leduc, Lloydminster, Regina, Rycroft, Selkirk, Tulsa, Valleyview, Victoria, Watford City, Weyburn, Whitecourt.

== Industries Served ==
Oil and Gas, Oil Sands, Petrochemical, Renewable Energy, Utilities, Agriculture, Forestry, Drilling, Midstream, Mining, Aggregate and Government
